= European cuisine =

Cuisine indigenous to Europe

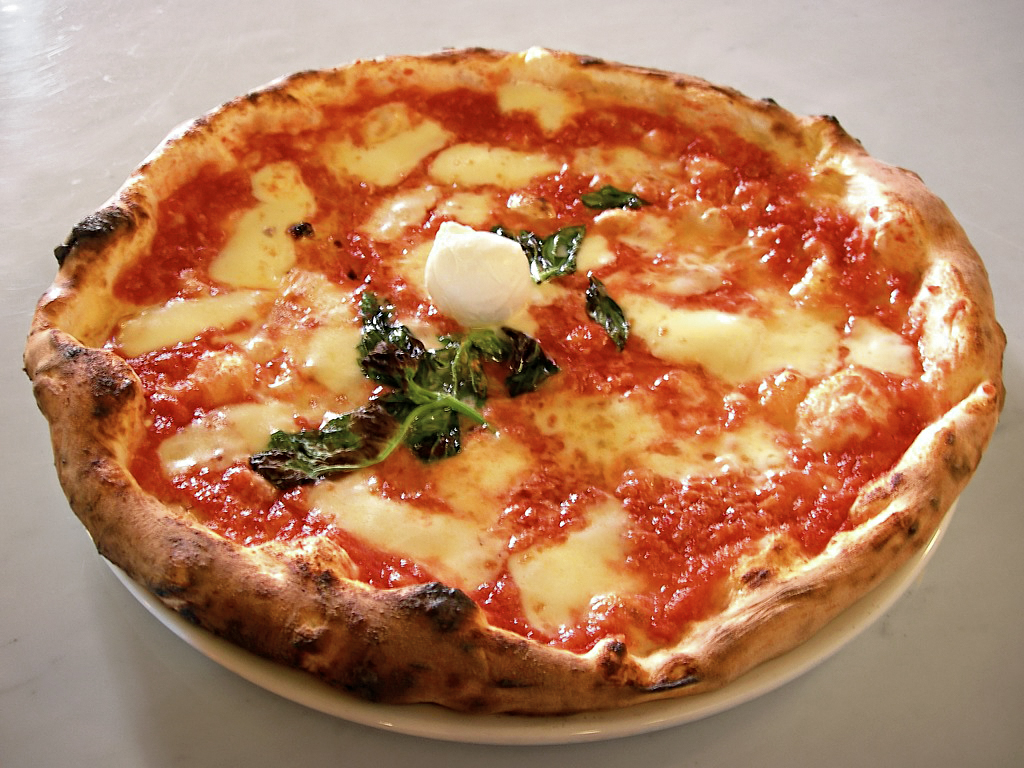
Italian pizza. Pizza is considered one of the national dishes of Italy and its variants are among the most popular foods in the world.

European cuisine (also known as Continental cuisine) comprises the traditional cuisines of the various countries in Europe.

The cuisines of European countries are diverse, although some common characteristics distinguish them from those of other regions. Compared to traditional cooking of East Asia, meat holds a more prominent and substantial role in serving size. Many dairy products are utilised in cooking. There are hundreds of varieties of cheese and other fermented milk products. White wheat-flour bread has long been the prestige starch, but historically, most people ate bread, flatcakes, or porridge made from rye, spelt, barley, and oats. Those better off would also make pasta, dumplings and pastries. The potato has become a major starch plant in the diet of Europeans and their diaspora since the European colonisation of the Americas. Maize is much less common in most European diets than it is in the Americas; however, cornmeal (polenta or mămăligă) is a major part of the cuisines of Italy, the Balkans and the Caucasus. Although flatbreads (especially those with toppings, such as pizza or tarte flambée) and rice are eaten in Europe, they are only staple foods in limited areas, particularly in Southern Europe. Salads—cold dishes with uncooked or cooked vegetables, sometimes with a dressing—are an integral part of European cuisine.

Formal European dinners are served in distinct courses. European presentation evolved from service à la française, or bringing multiple dishes to the table at once, into service à la russe, where dishes are presented sequentially. Usually, cold, hot and savoury, and sweet dishes are served strictly separately in this order, as hors d'œuvre (appetizer) or soup, as entrée and main course, and as dessert. Dishes that are both sweet and savoury were common earlier in Ancient Roman cuisine, but are today uncommon, with sweet dishes usually being served only as dessert. A service where the guests are free to take food by themselves is termed a buffet, and is usually restricted to parties or holidays.

Historically, European cuisine has been developed in the European royal and noble courts. European nobility was usually arms-bearing and lived in separate manors in the countryside. The knife was the primary eating implement (cutlery), and eating steaks and other foods that require cutting followed its adoption. This contrasted with East Asian cuisine, where the ruling class consisted of court officials, who had their food prepared in the kitchen, ready to be eaten with chopsticks. The knife was supplanted by the spoon for soups, while the fork was introduced later in the early modern period, in or around the 16th century. Today, most dishes are intended to be eaten with cutlery and only a few finger foods can be eaten with the hands in polite company.

== History ==
=== Medieval ===
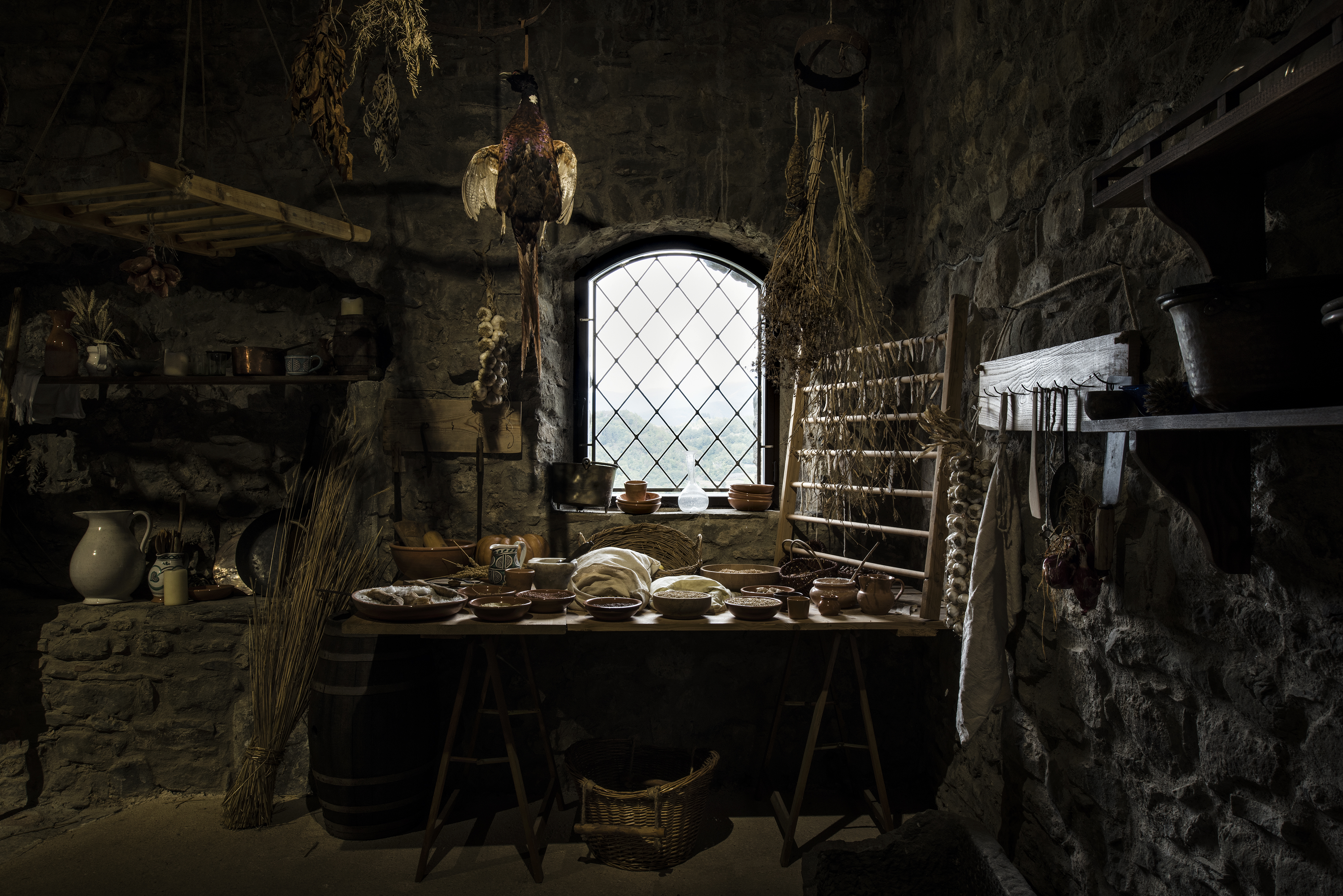
A restored medieval kitchen inside Verrucole Castle, Tuscany, Italy

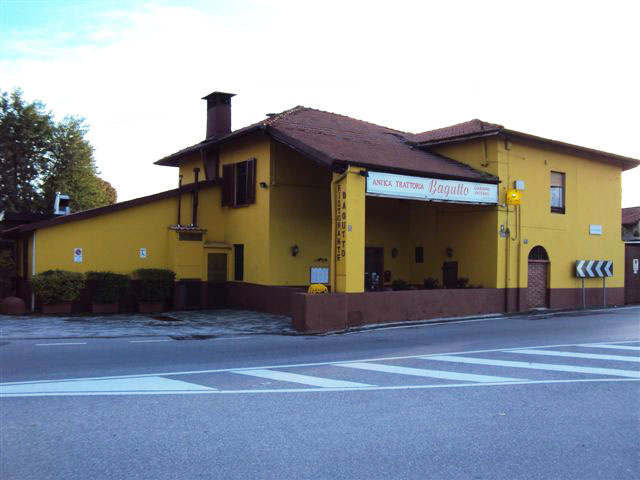
The Antica trattoria Bagutto in Milan, Italy, the oldest restaurant in Italy and the second in Europe

In medieval times, a person's diet varied depending on their social class. However, cereal grains made up a significant part of a medieval person's diet, regardless of social class. Bread was common to both classes; it was eaten for lunch by working men, and thick slices of it were used as plates called trenchers. People of the noble class had access to finely ground flours for their breads and other baked goods. Noblemen were allowed to hunt for deer, boar, rabbits, birds, and other animals, giving them access to fresh meat and fish for their meals. Dishes for people of these classes were often heavily spiced. Spices at that time were very expensive, and the more spices used in dishes, the more wealth the person needed to purchase such ingredients. Common spices used were cinnamon, ginger, nutmeg, pepper, cumin, cloves, turmeric, anise, and saffron. Other ingredients used in dishes for the nobility and clergy included sugar, almonds and dried fruits like raisins. These imported ingredients would have been very expensive and nearly impossible for commoners to obtain. When banquets were held, the dishes served would be spectacular, another way for the noblemen to show how rich they were. Sugar sculptures would be placed on the tables as decoration and to eat, and foods would be dyed vibrant colors with imported spices.

Milan is home to the oldest restaurant in Italy and the second oldest in Europe, the Antica trattoria Bagutto, which has existed since at least 1284. The diet of a commoner would have been much simpler. Strict poaching laws prevented them from hunting, and if they did hunt and were caught, they could have parts of their limbs cut off or they could be killed. Much of the commoners' food would have been preserved in some way, such as through pickling or salting. Breads would have been made using rye or barley, and any vegetables would likely have been grown by the commoners themselves. Peasants would have likely been able to keep cows, and so would have access to milk, which then allowed them to make butter or cheese. When meat was eaten, it would have been beef, pork, or lamb. Commoners also ate pottage, a thick stew of vegetables, grains, and meat.

=== Early modern era ===
Still life with a peacock pie, 1627, by Dutch artist Pieter Claesz, showing various dishes from the 17th century including roast meat, breads, nuts, wine, apples, dried fruits, along with an elaborate meat pie decorated like a peacock. While common in the warmer climates of Southern Europe, lemons would have been a relatively new introduction to the Netherlands, requiring growing in a orangery.

The cuisine of early modern Europe during the 16th through 19th centuries consisted of a mix of dishes inherited from medieval cuisine combined with innovations that persisted in the modern era.

The discovery of the New World, the establishment of new trade routes with Asia, and increased foreign influences from sub-Saharan Africa and the Middle East meant that Europeans became familiarized with many new foodstuffs. Spices that had been prohibitively expensive luxuries, such as pepper, cinnamon, cloves, nutmeg, and ginger, soon became available to the majority of the population, and the introduction of new plants from the New World and India like maize, potato, sweet potato, chili pepper, cocoa, vanilla, tomato, coffee, and tea transformed European cuisine.

Though there was a great influx of new ideas, an increase in foreign trade, and a Scientific Revolution, preservation of foods remained traditional: drying, salting, smoking, or pickling in vinegar. Fare was naturally dependent on the season; a cookbook by Domenico Romoli called Panunto made a virtue of necessity by including a recipe for each day of the year. Both doctors and chefs continued to characterize foodstuffs by their effects on the four humours: foods and beverages were considered to be heating or cooling, and moistening or drying, to the constitution.

Prosperity increased in Europe during this period, gradually reaching all classes and areas, and considerably changed the patterns of eating. Nationalism was first conceived in the early modern period, but it was not until the 19th century that the notion of a national cuisine emerged. Class differences were more important dividing lines, and it was almost always upper-class food that was described in recipe collections and cookbooks.

European cuisine by regions

== Southern European cuisines ==
- (Albania) Albanian cuisine
- Aromanian cuisine
- (Bosnia and Herzegovina) Bosnian cuisine
- (Croatia) Croatian cuisine
- (Cyprus) Cypriot cuisine
- (Gibraltar) Gibraltarian cuisine
- (Greece) Greek cuisine
  - Ancient Greek cuisine
  - (Byzantine Empire) Byzantine cuisine
  - Cretan cuisine
  - Epirotic cuisine
  - Greek Macedonian cuisine
  - Ionian cuisine
- (Italy) Italian cuisine
  - (Abruzzo) Abruzzian cuisine
  - Ancient Roman cuisine
  - (Apulia) Apulian cuisine
  - Arbëreshë cuisine
  - (Liguria) Ligurian cuisine
  - (Lombardy) Lombard cuisine
    - (Mantua) Mantuan cuisine
  - (Basilicata) Lucanian cuisine
  - (Campania) Neapolitan cuisine
  - (Piedmont) Piedmontese cuisine
  - (Rome) Roman cuisine
  - (Sardinia) Sardinian cuisine
  - (Sicily) Sicilian cuisine
  - (Veneto) Venetian cuisine
- (Kosovo) Kosovar cuisine
- (North Macedonia) Macedonian cuisine
- (Malta) Maltese cuisine
- (Montenegro) Montenegrin cuisine
- (Ottoman Empire) Ottoman cuisine
- (Portugal) Portuguese cuisine
- (San Marino) Sammarinese cuisine
- Sephardic Jewish cuisine
- (Serbia) Serbian cuisine
- (Spain) Spanish cuisine
  - (Andalusia) Andalusian cuisine
  - (Aragon) Aragonese cuisine
  - (Asturias) Asturian cuisine
  - (Balearic Islands) Balearic cuisine
    - (Menorca) Menorcan cuisine
  - (Basque Country (autonomous community)) Basque cuisine
  - (Canary Islands) Canarian cuisine
  - (Cantabria) Cantabrian cuisine
  - (Castile and León) Castilian-Leonese cuisine
    - (Valladolid) Vallisoletano cuisine
  - (Catalonia) (Andorra) Catalan cuisine
  - (Castilla–La Mancha) Castilian-Manchego cuisine
  - Deconstructed cuisine
  - (Extremadura) Extremaduran cuisine
  - (Galicia (Spain)) Galician cuisine
  - (Community of Madrid) Madrilenian cuisine
  - (Valencian Community) Valencian cuisine
- (Turkey) Turkish cuisine
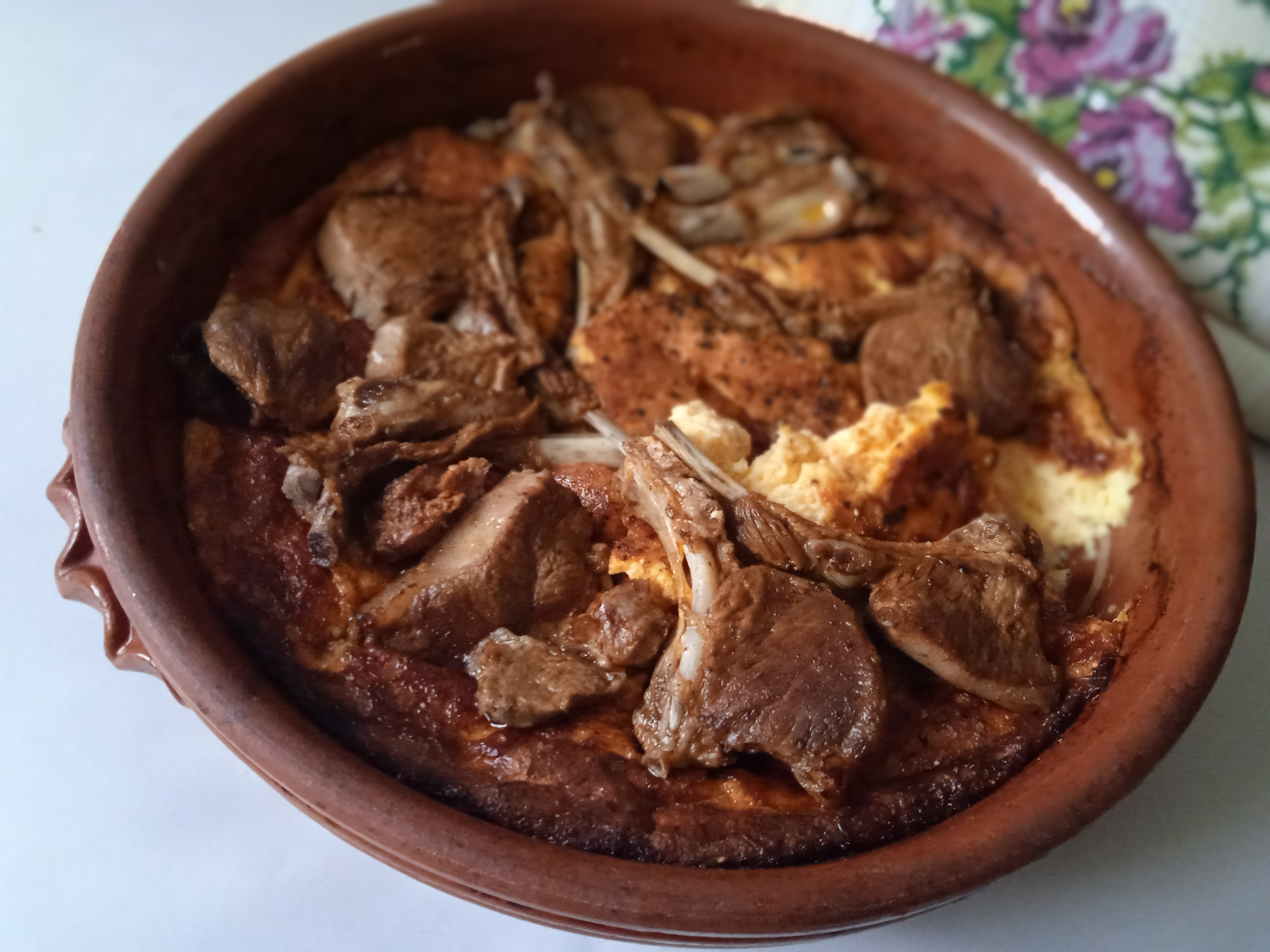
Albanian Tavë kosi

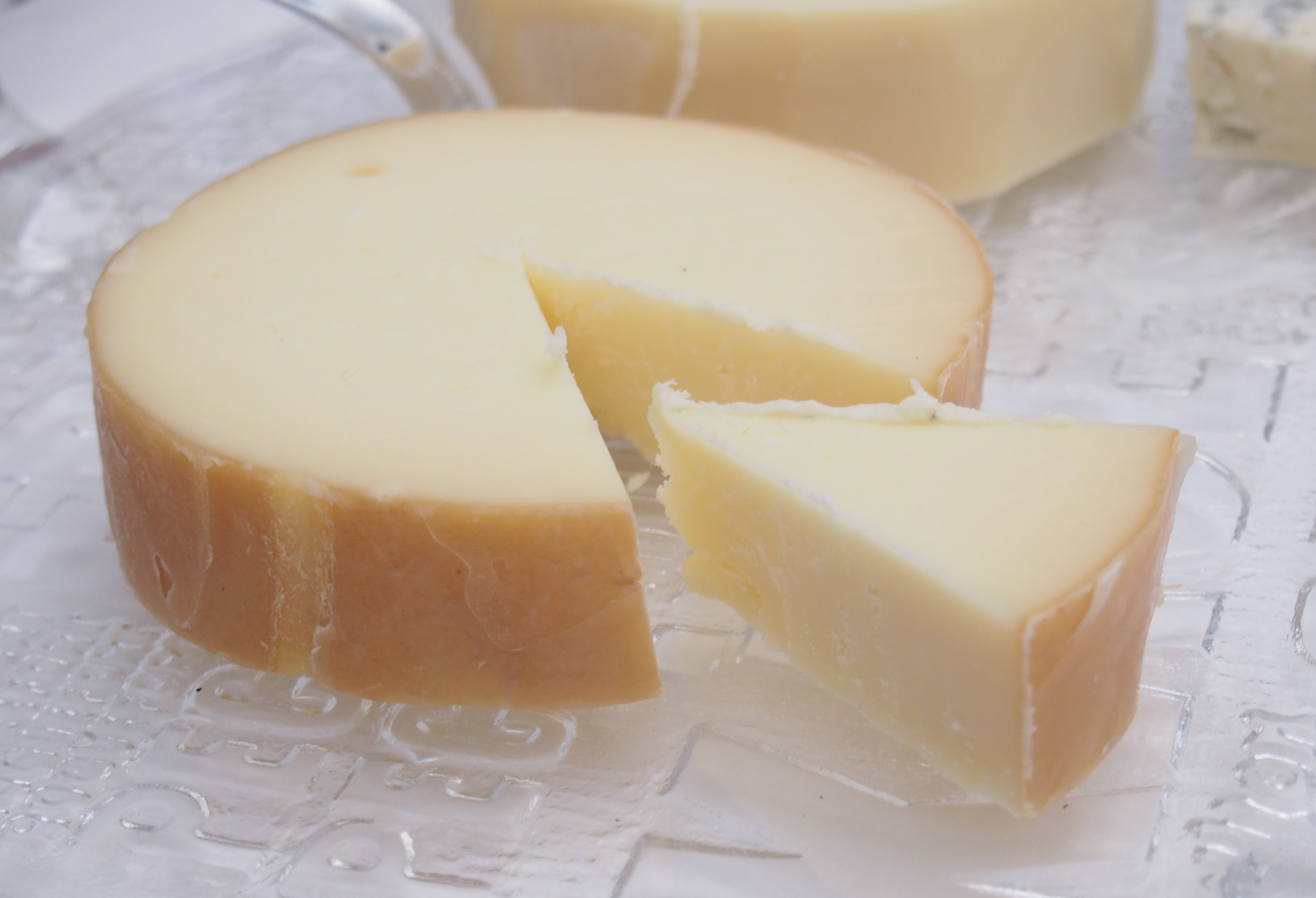
Aromanian Metsovone

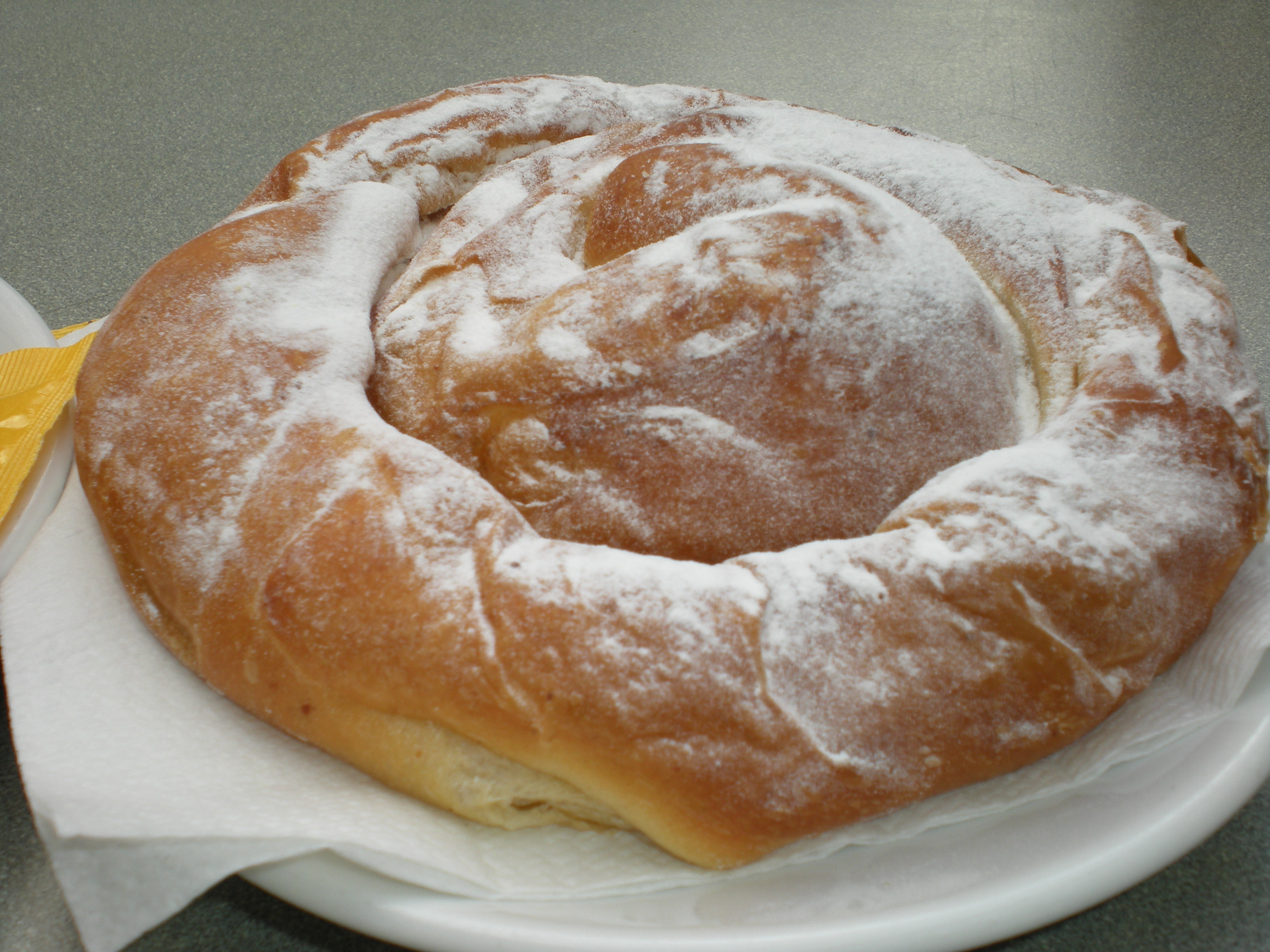
Balearic ensaïmada

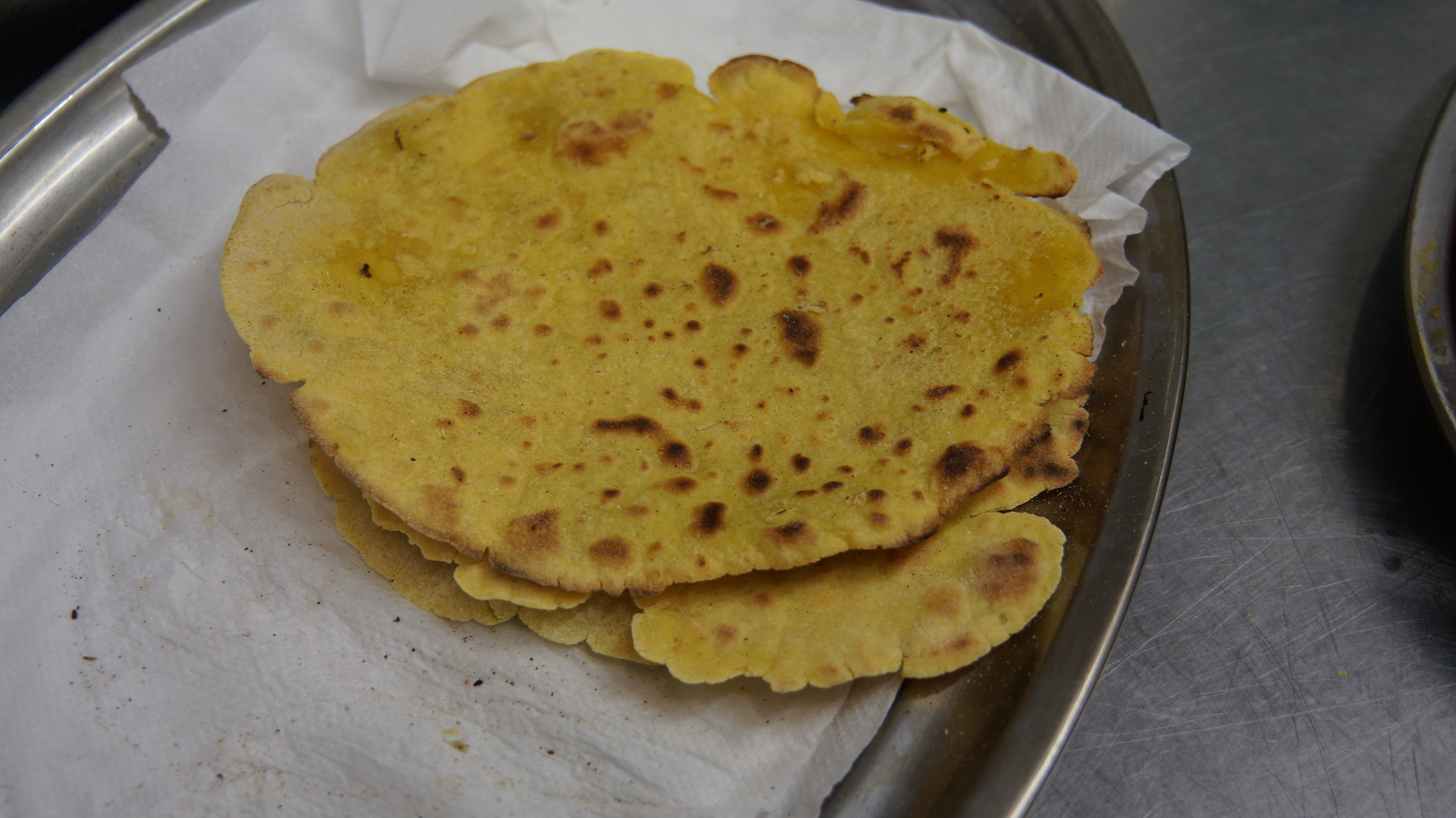
Basque talo

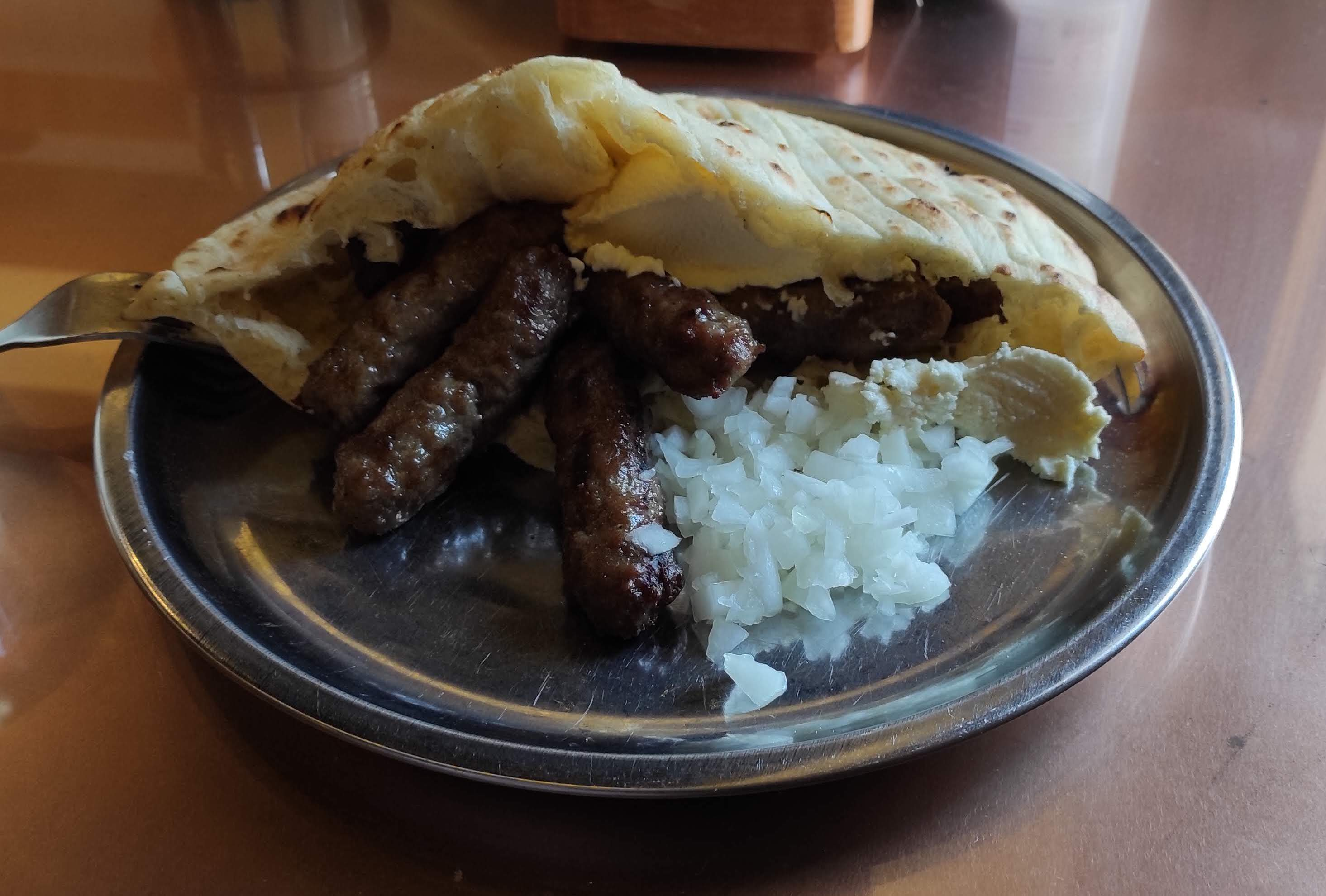
Bosnian ćevapi

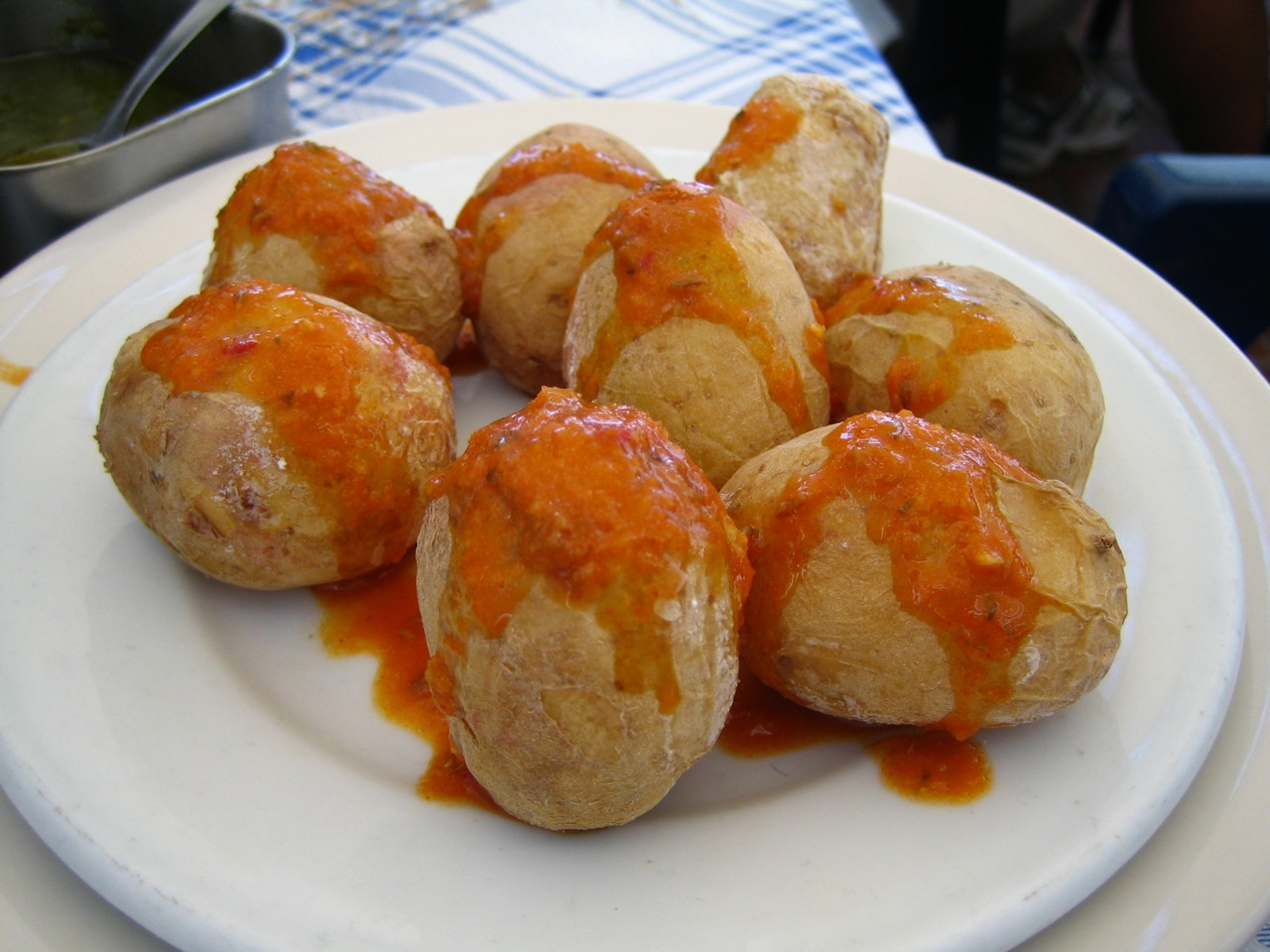
Canarian Papas arrugadas

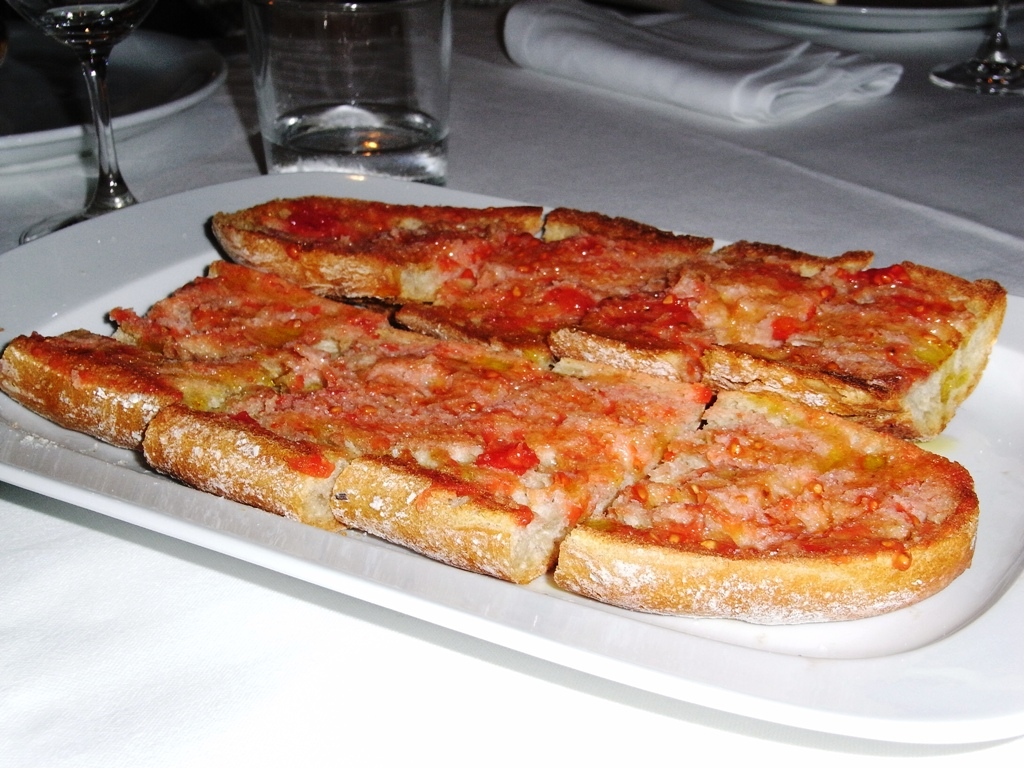
Catalan pa amb tomàquet

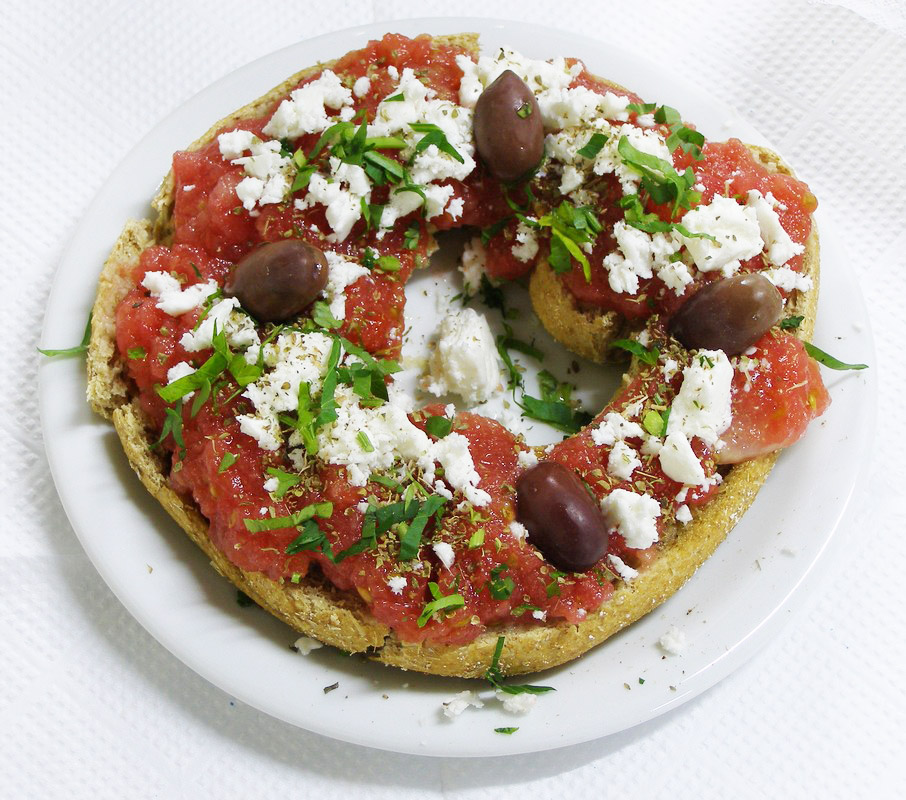
Cretan Dakos

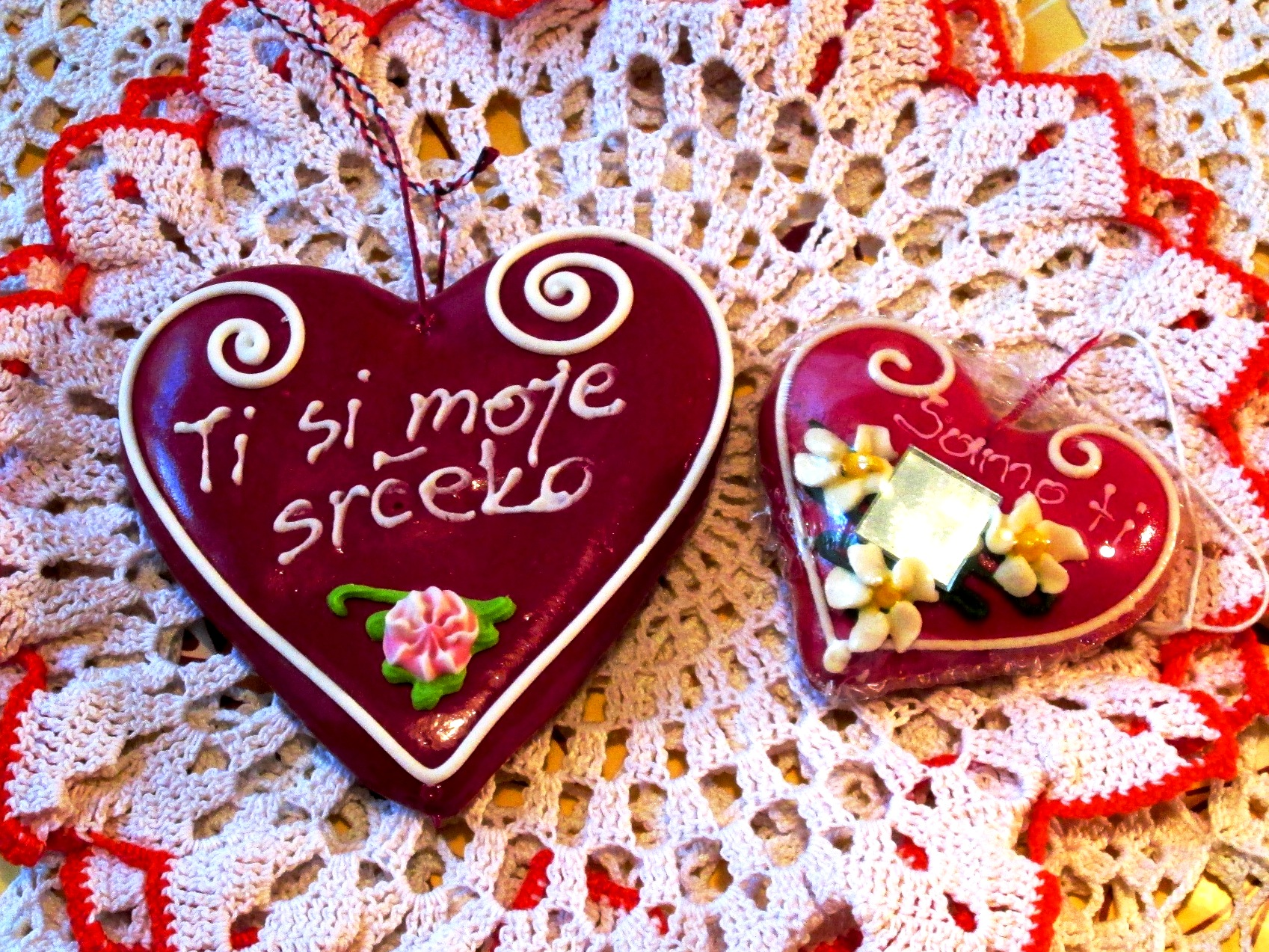
Croatian Licitar

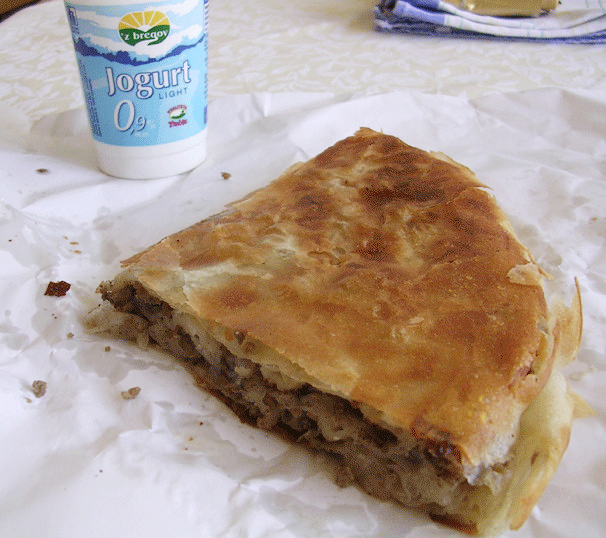
Croatian Burek

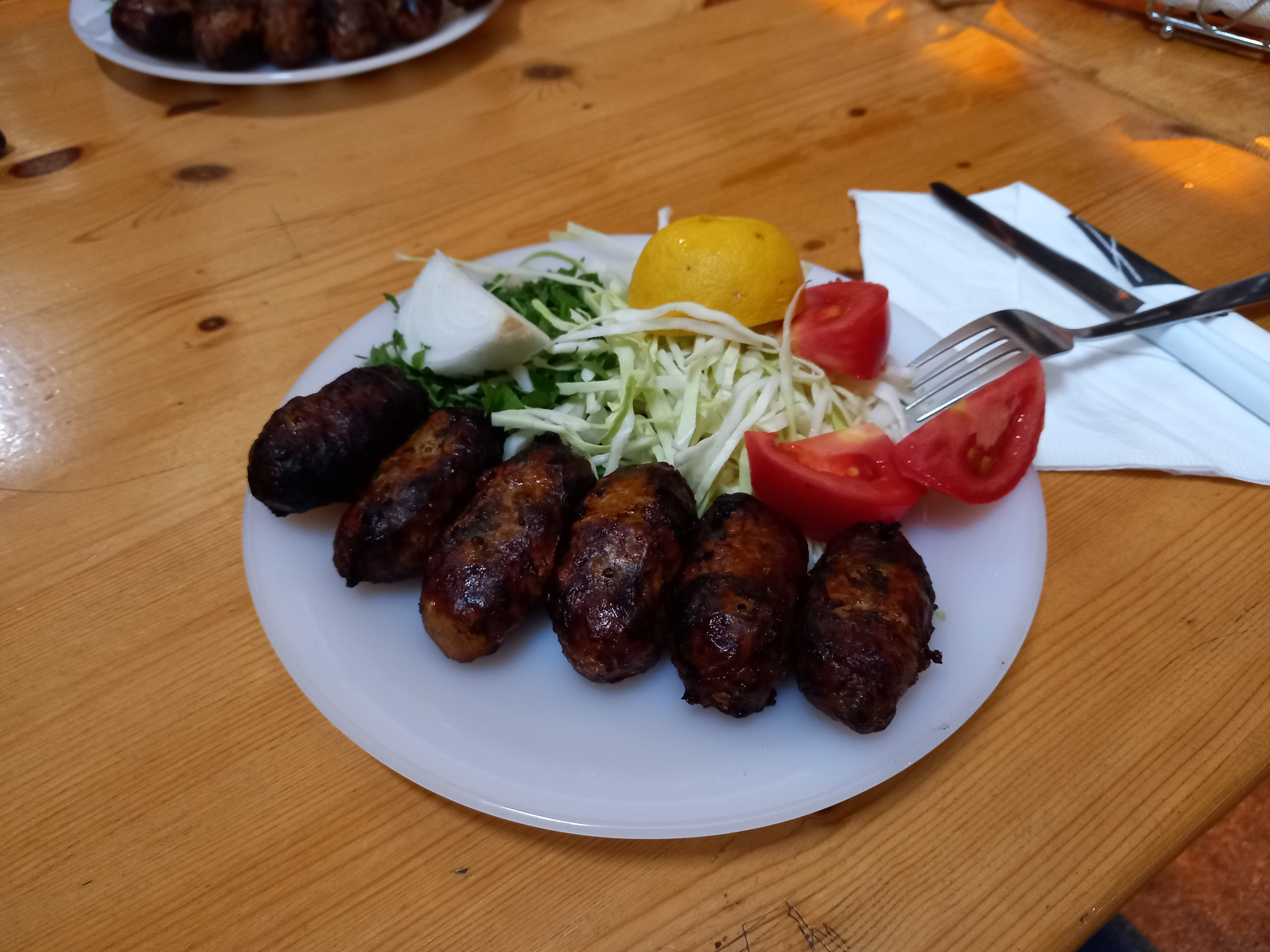
Cypriot Sheftalia

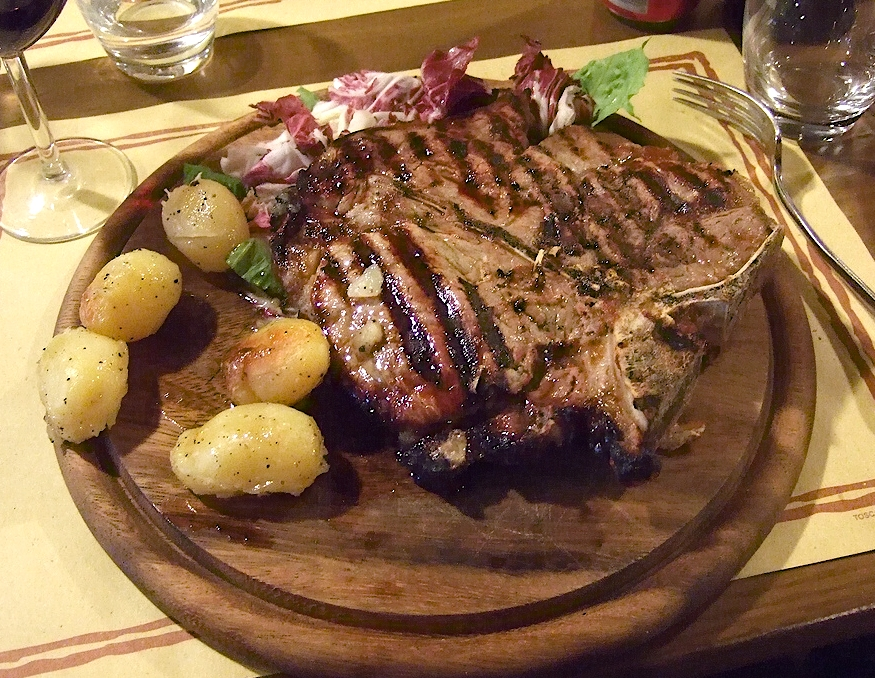
Florentine bistecca alla fiorentina

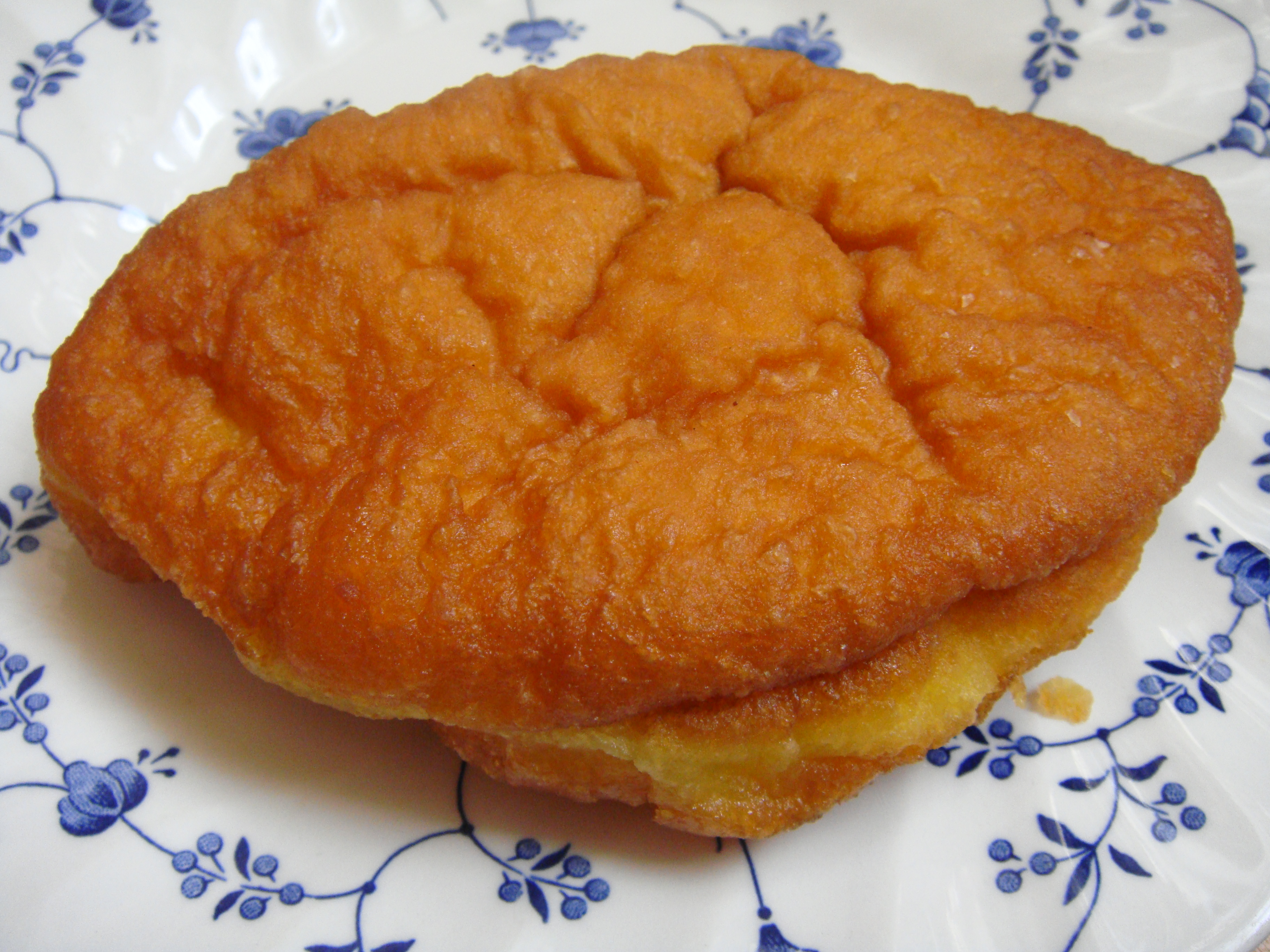
Gibraltarian japonesa

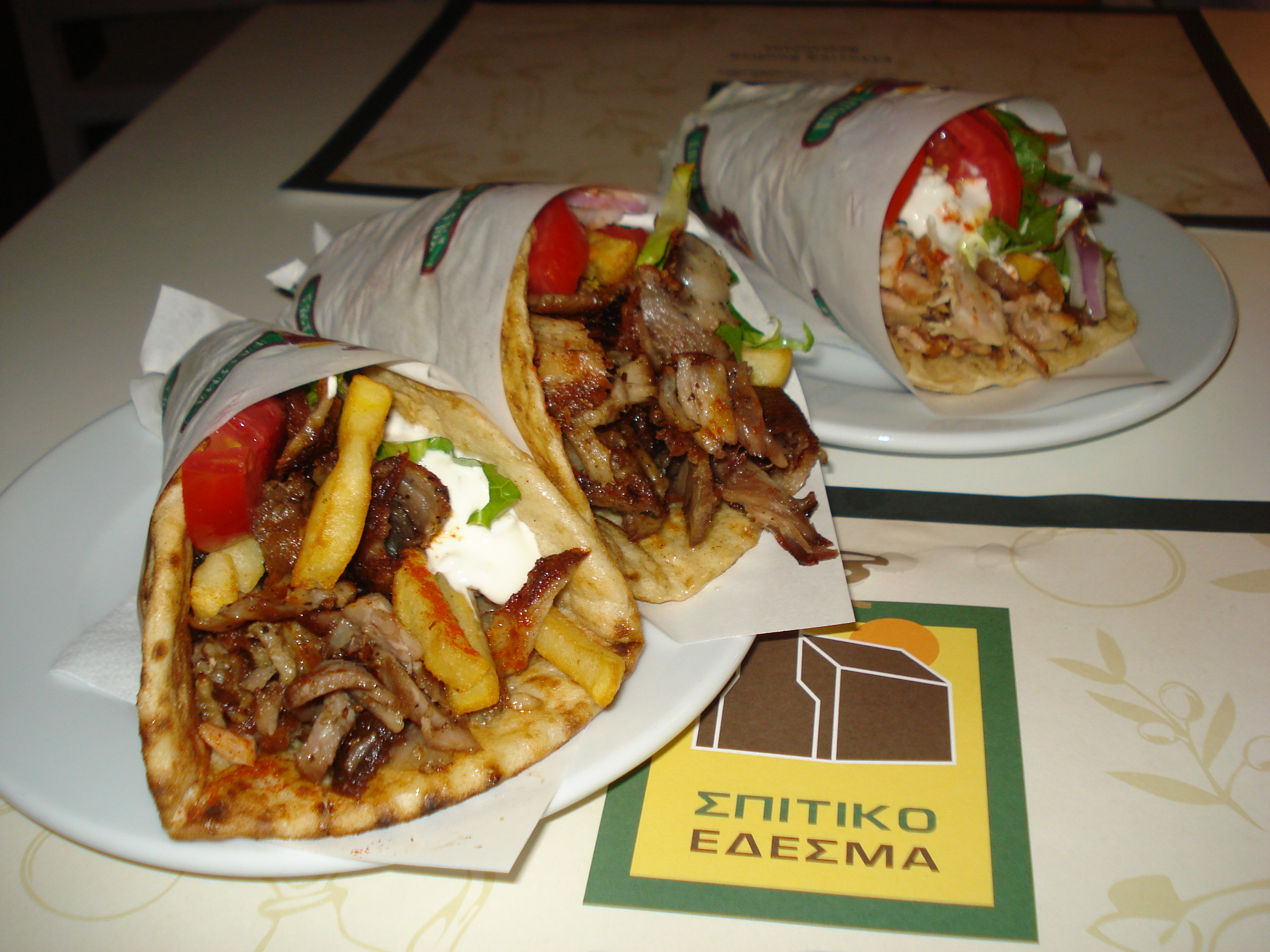
Greek gyros

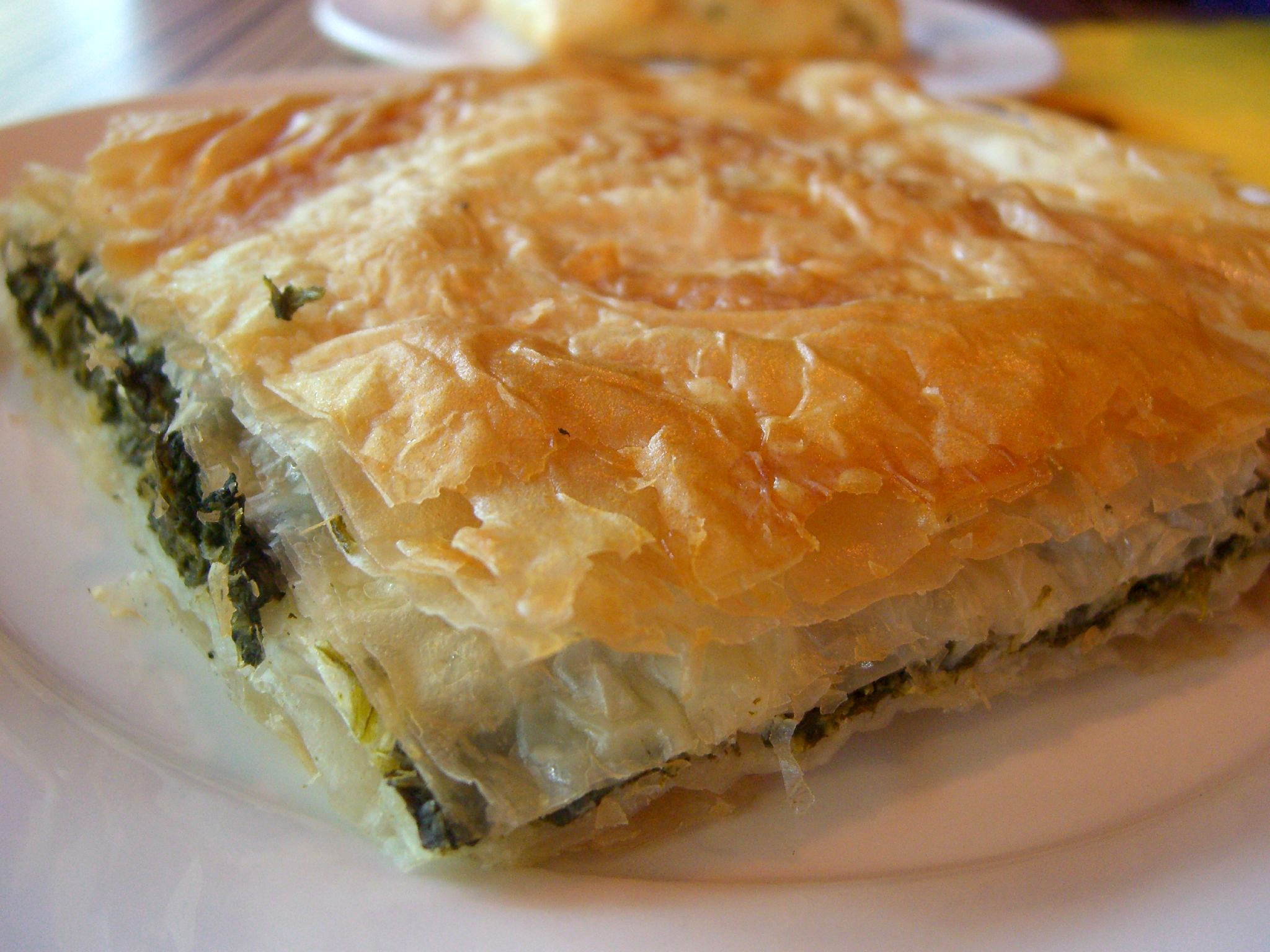
Greek spanakopita

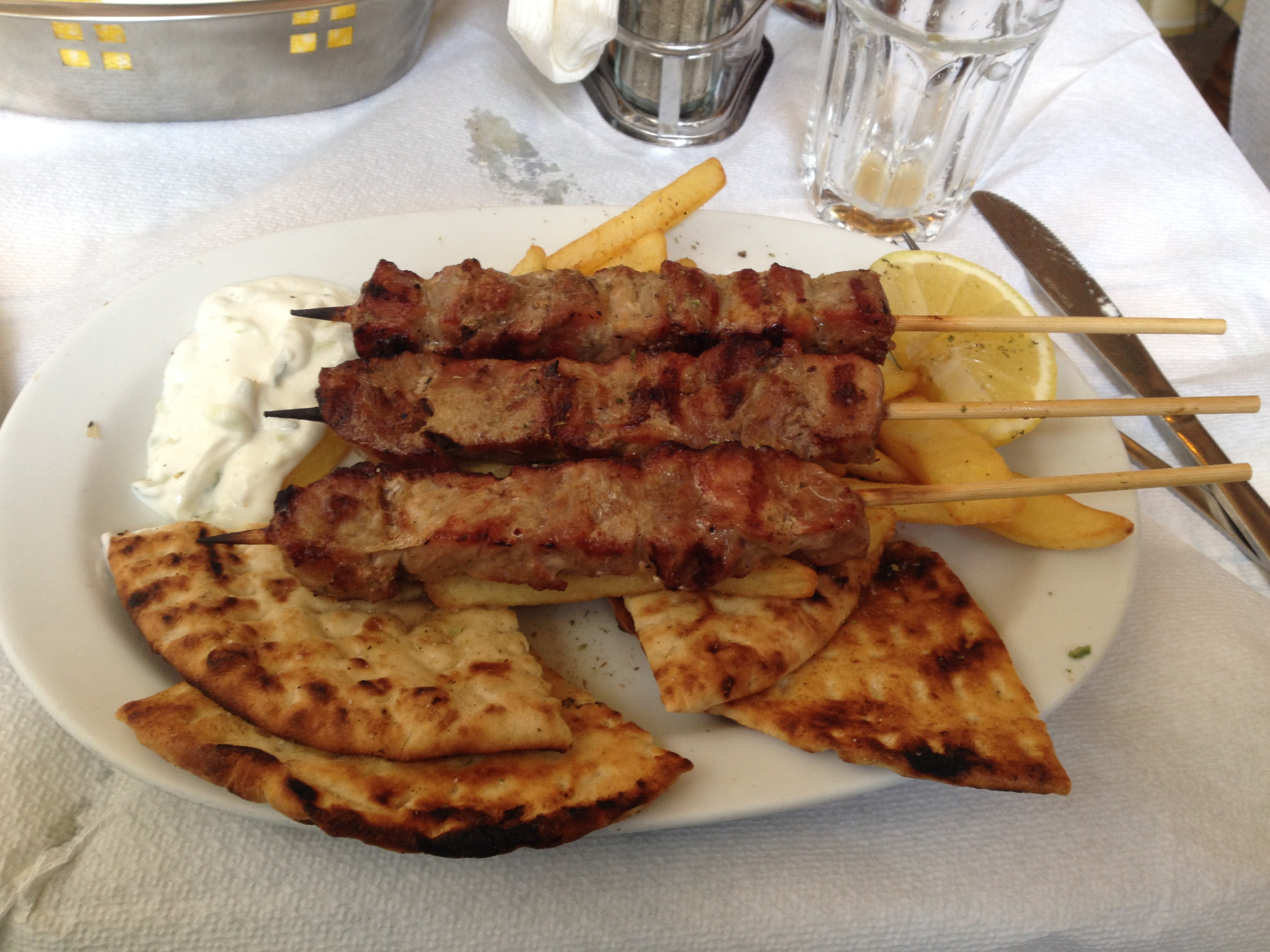
Greek souvlaki

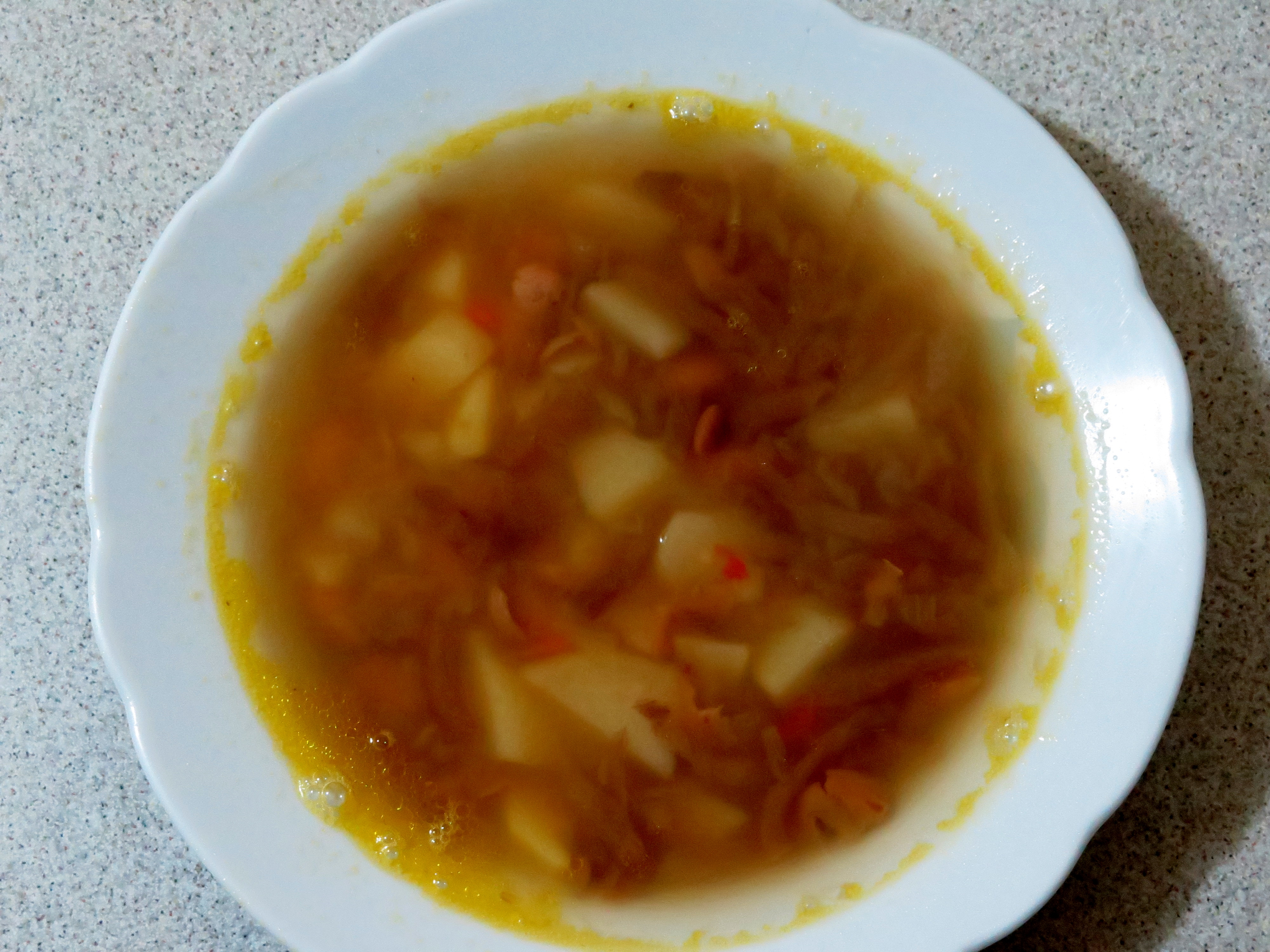
Istrian stew

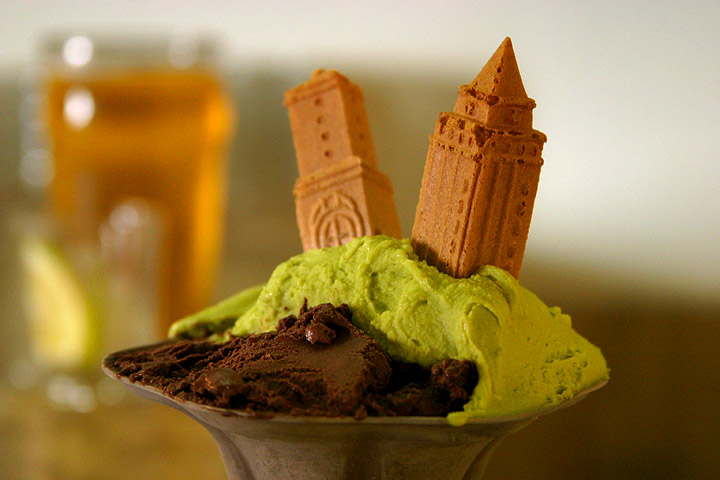
Italian gelato

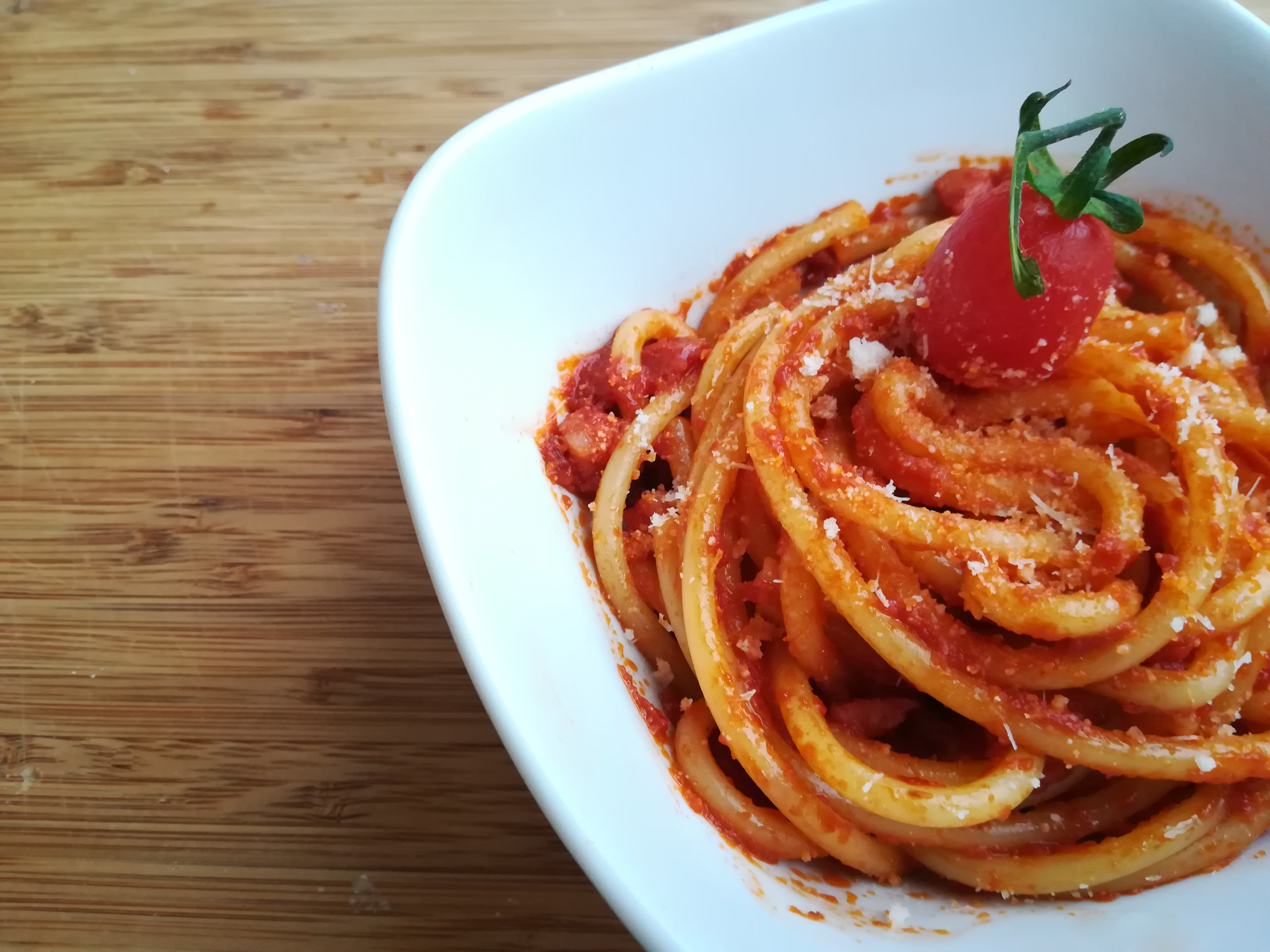
Italian amatriciana

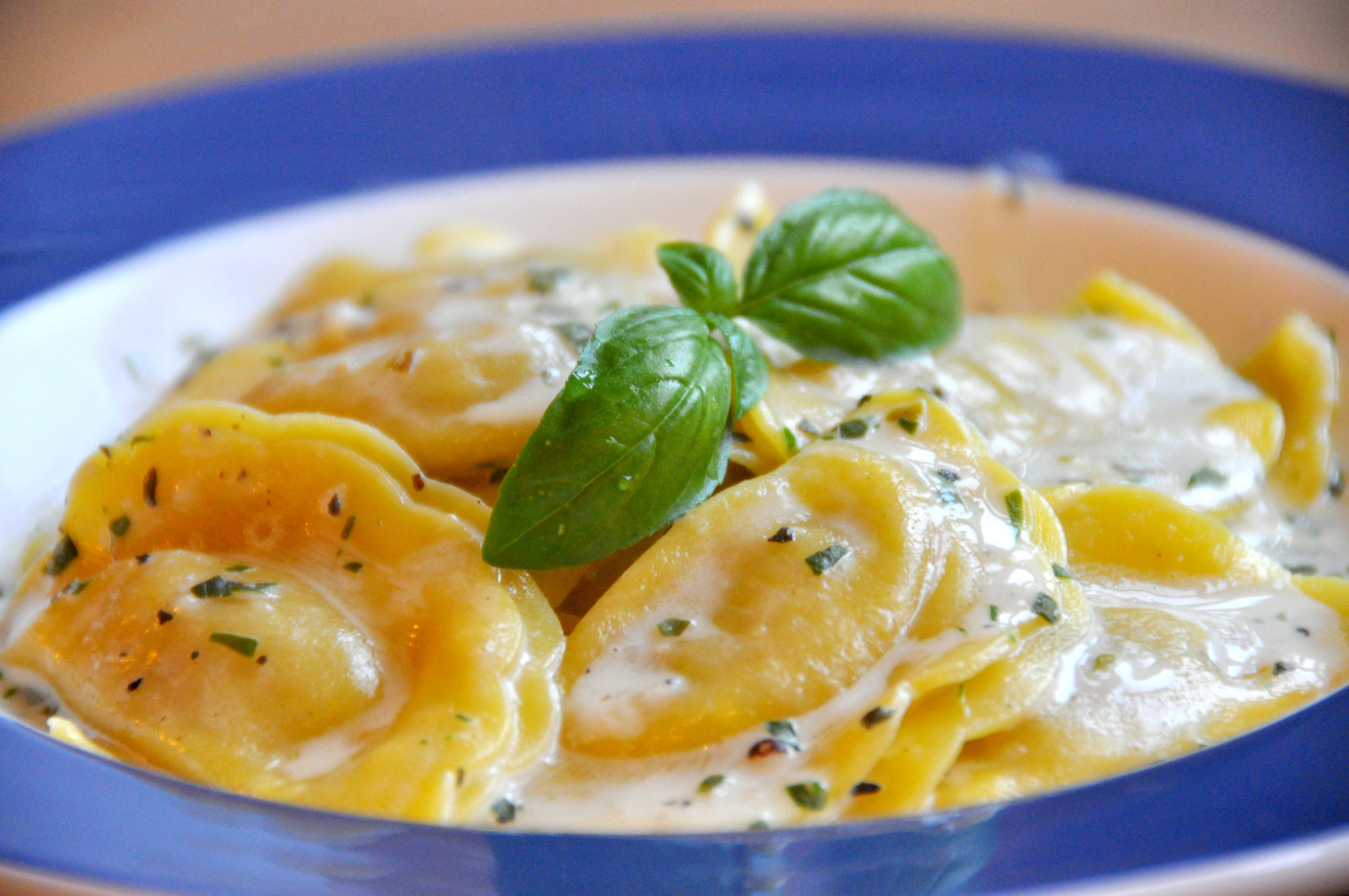
Italian ravioli

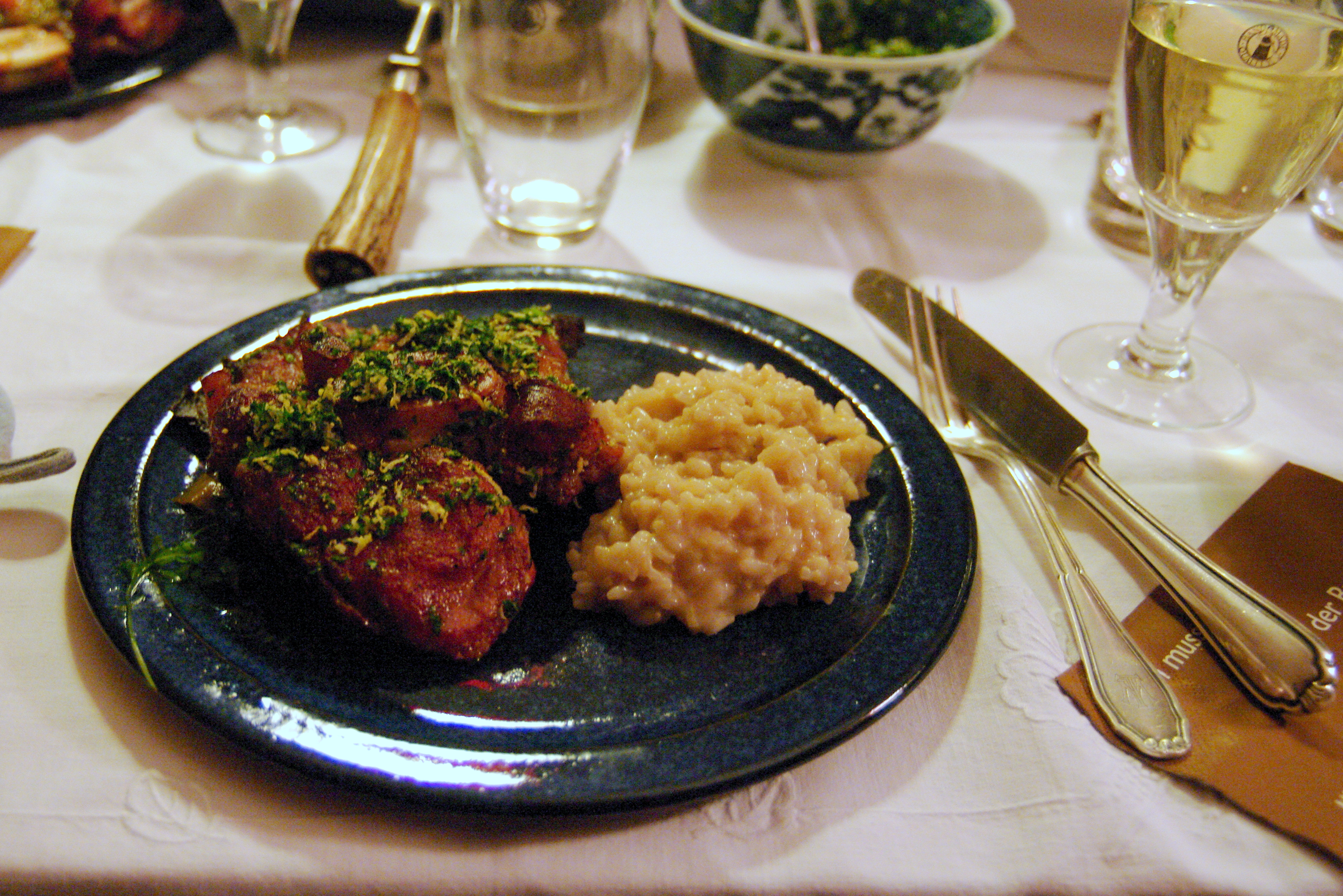
Lombard Ossobuco served with risotto alla milanese

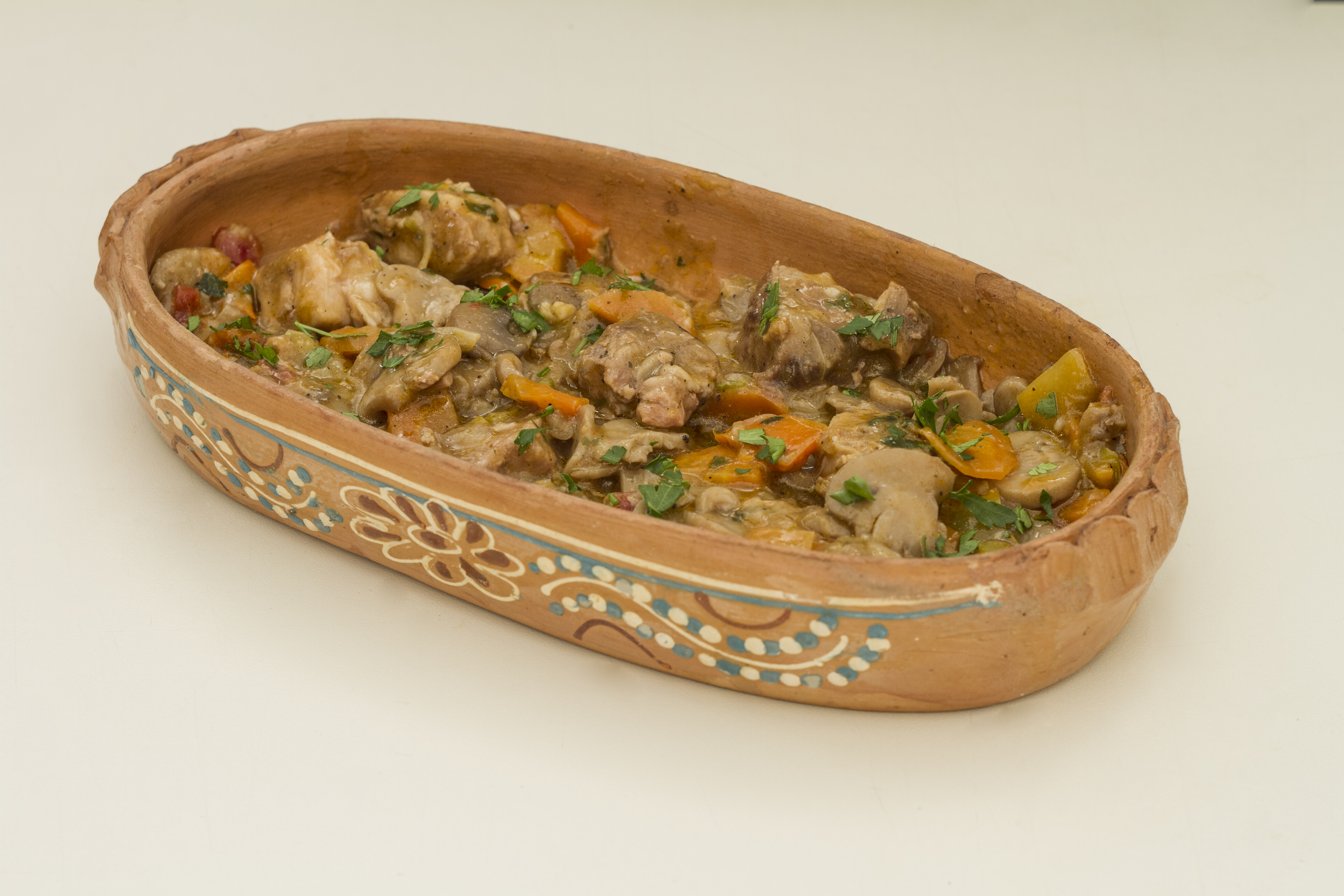
Macedonian selsko meso

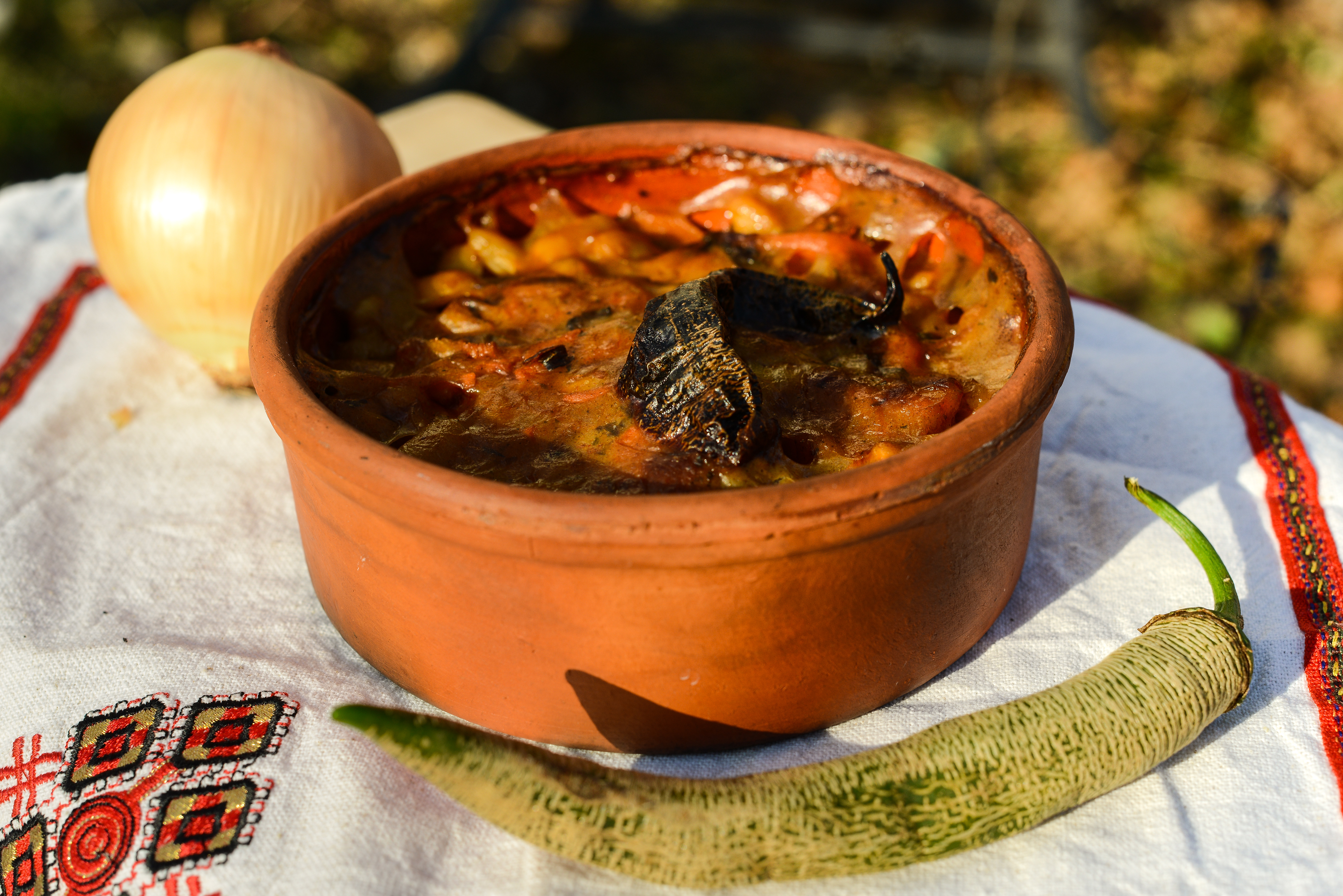
Macedonian Tavče gravče

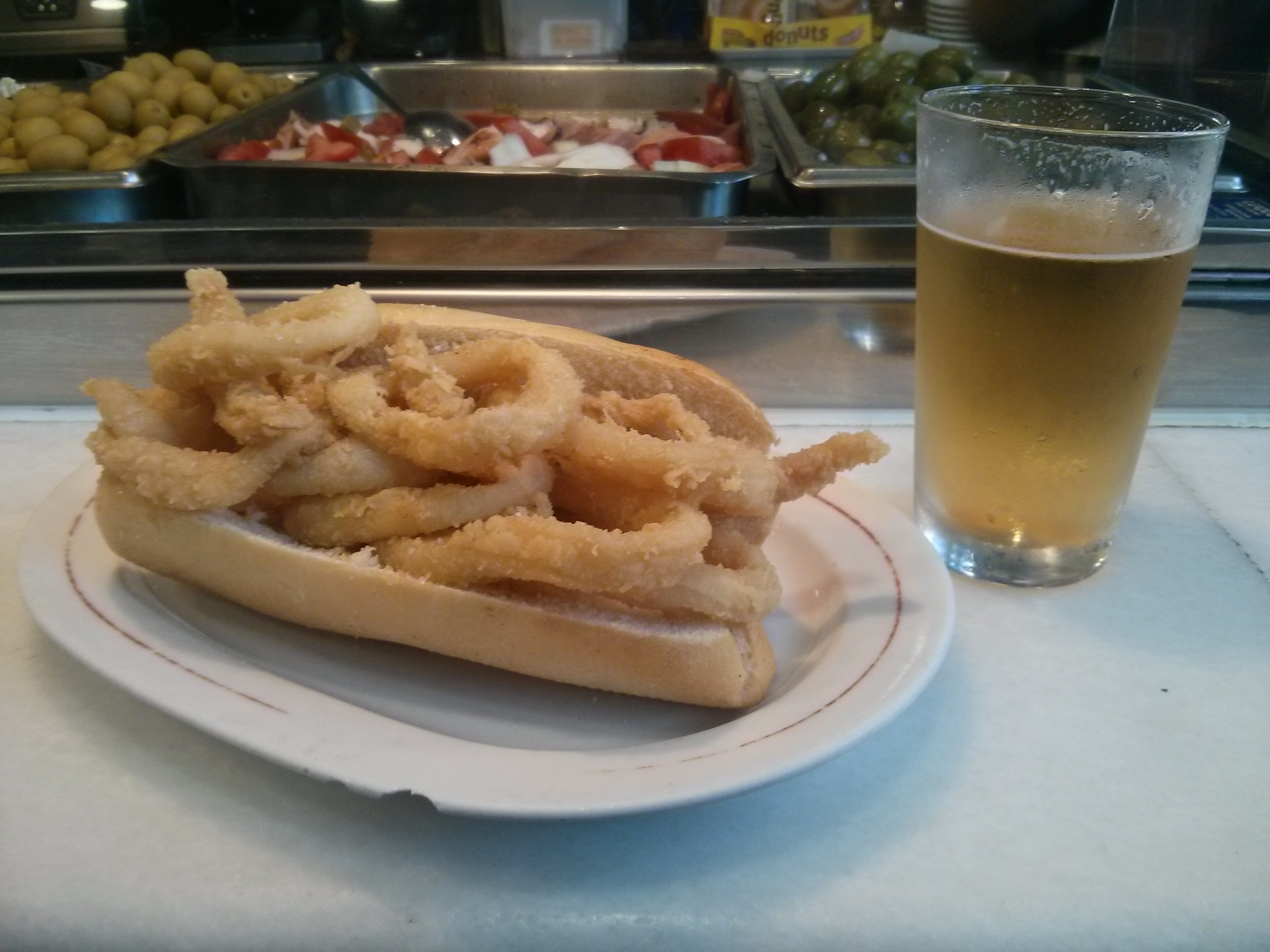
Madrilenian squid sandwich

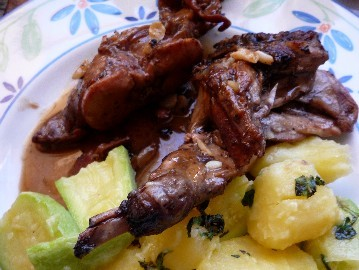
Maltese Stuffat tal-Fenek

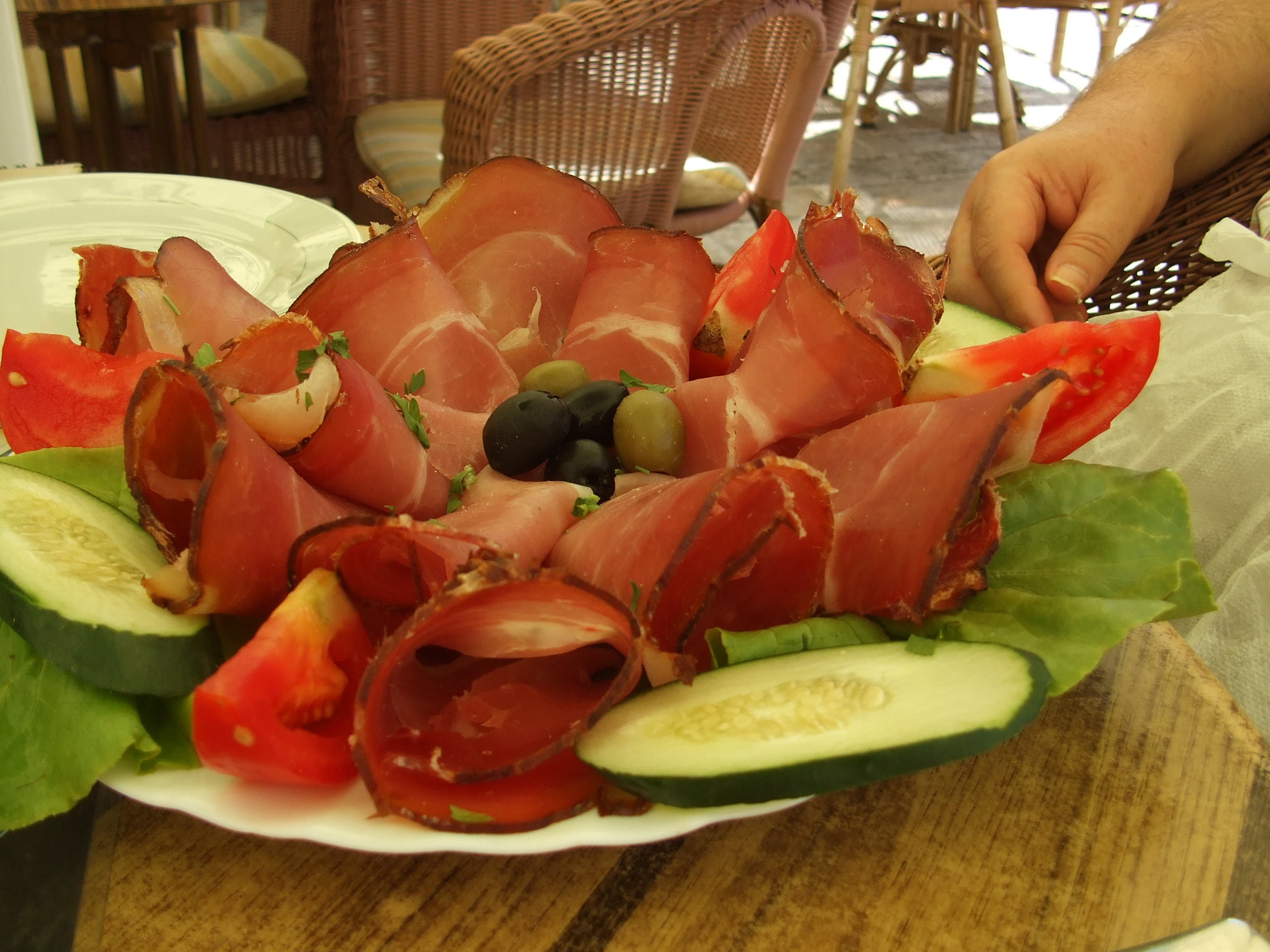
Montenegrin njeguški pršut

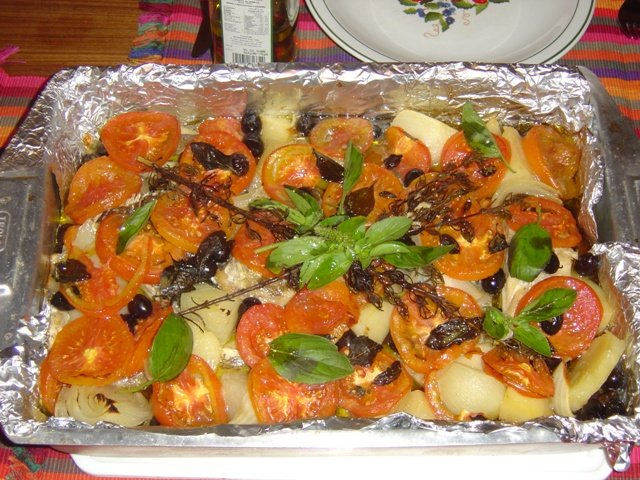
Portuguese bacalhau

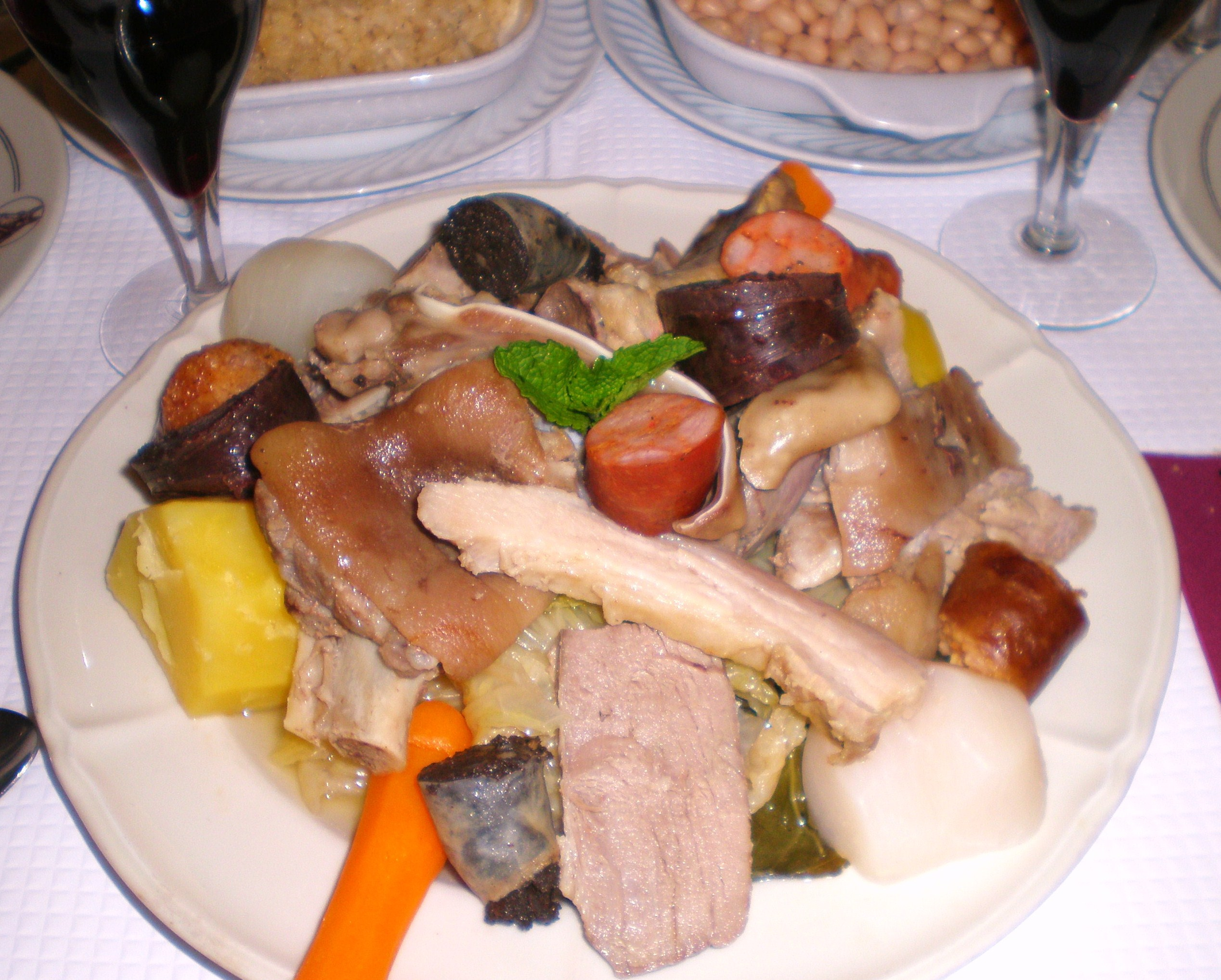
Portuguese Cozido à portuguesa

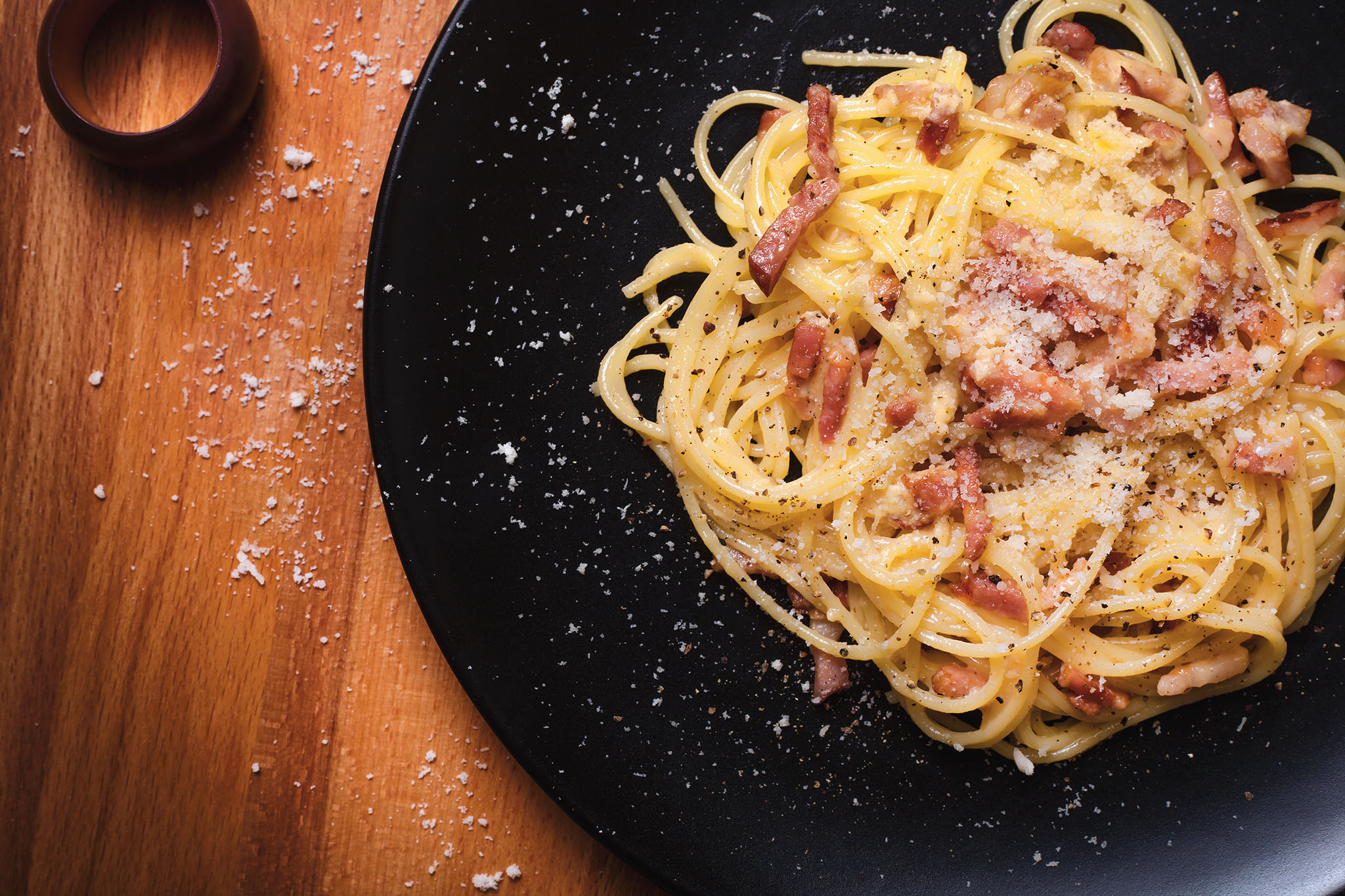
Roman carbonara

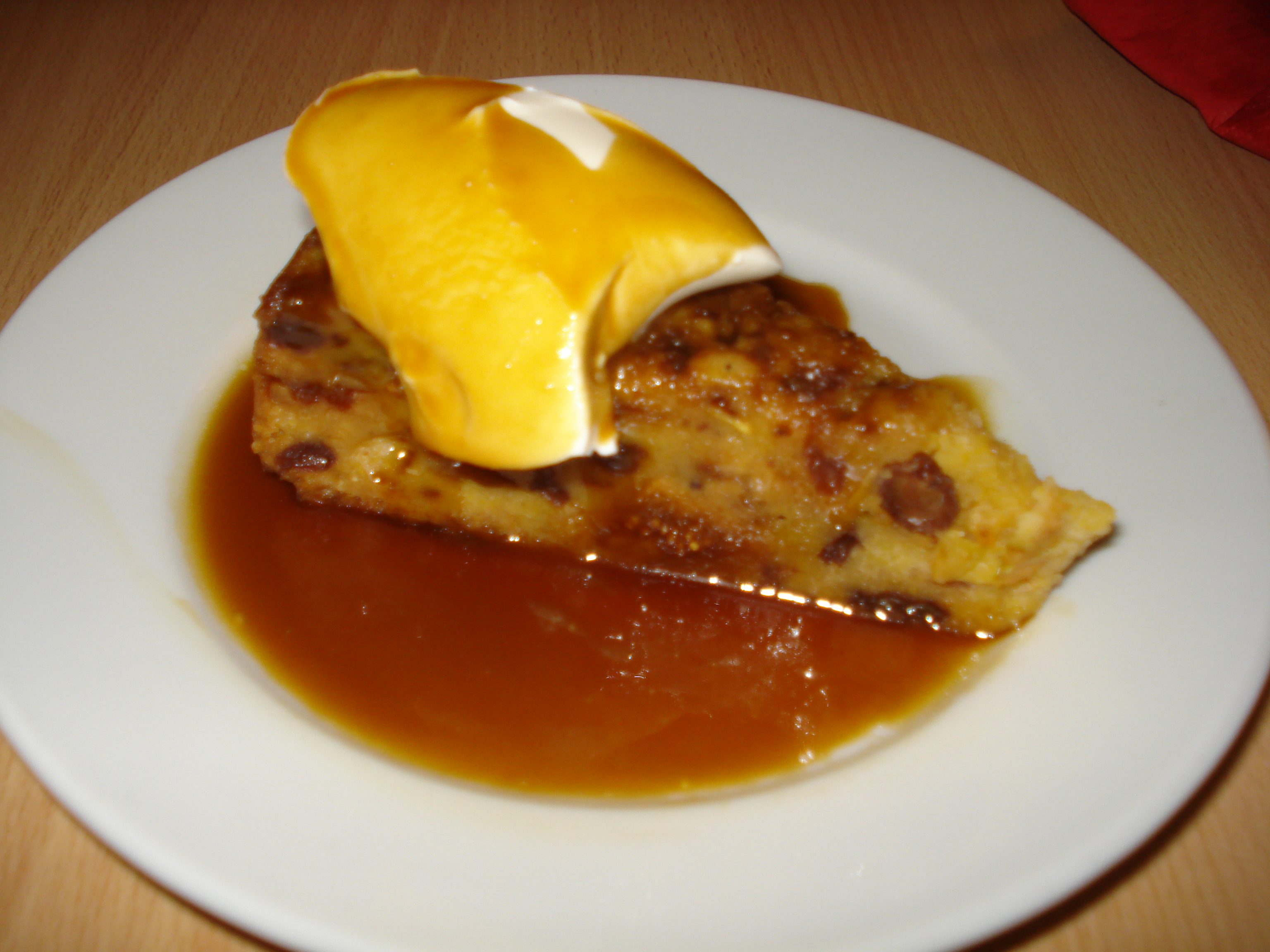
Sammarinese Bustrengo

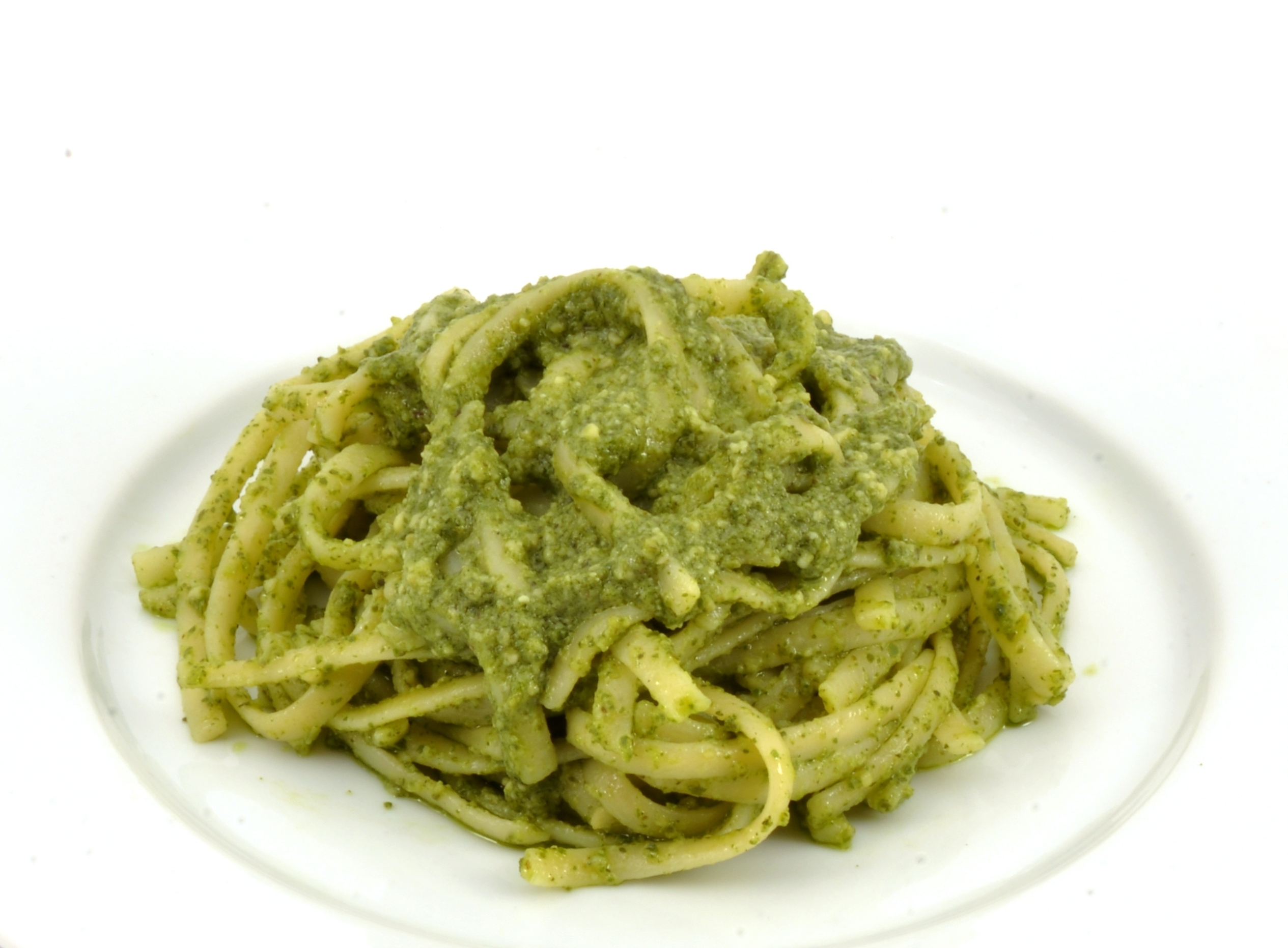
Liguarian Linguine with pesto

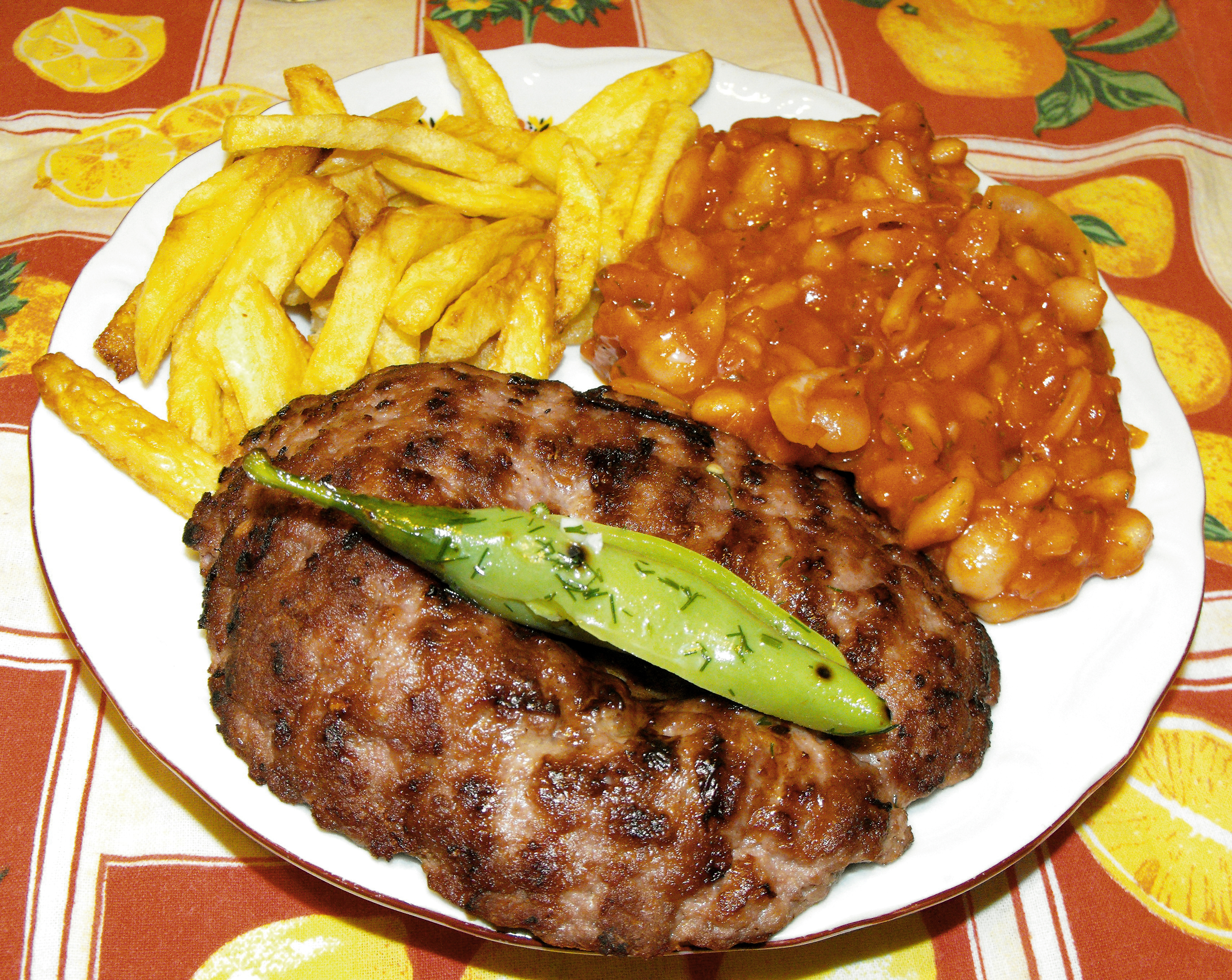
Serbian Pljeskavica

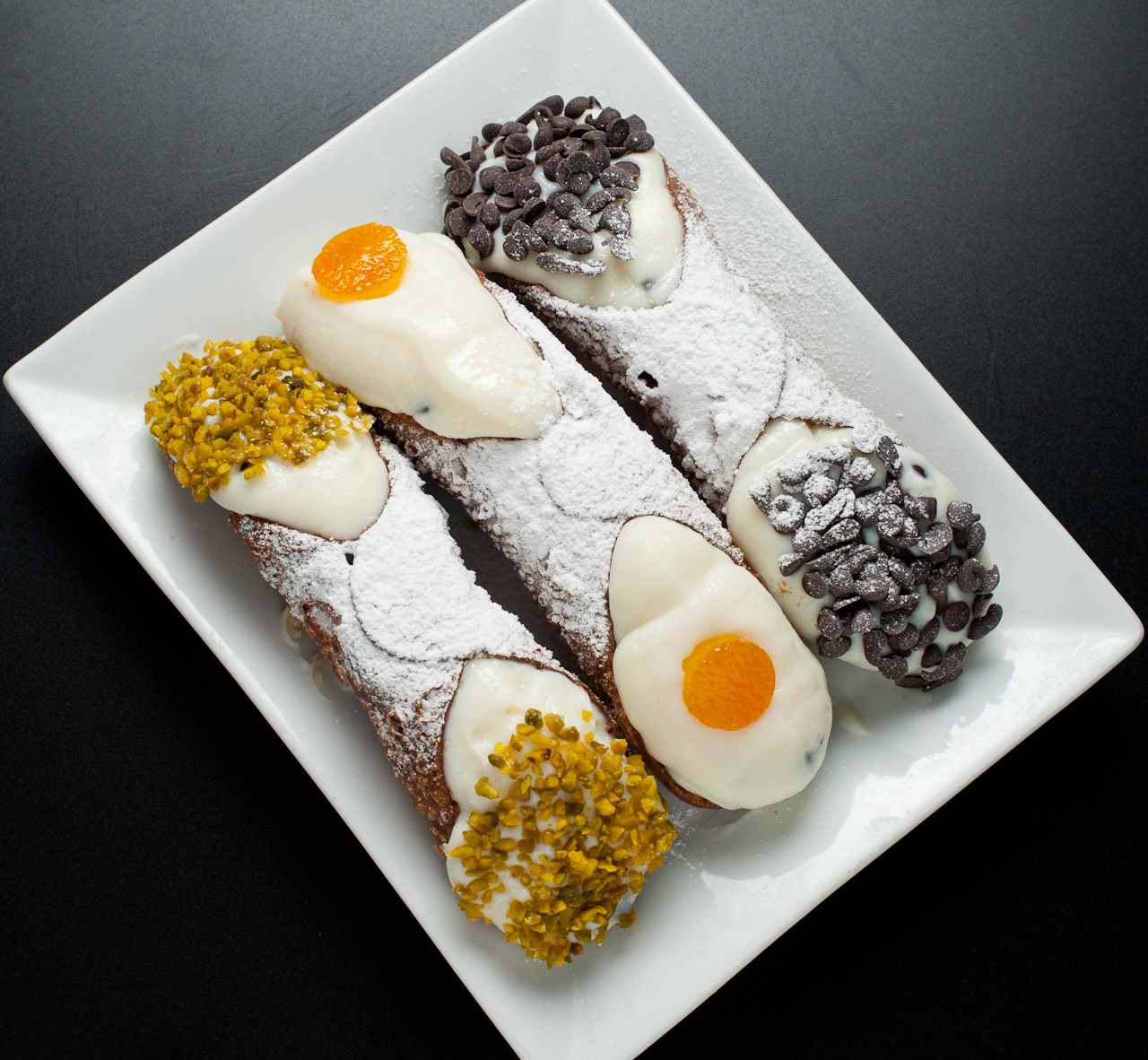
Sicilian cannoli

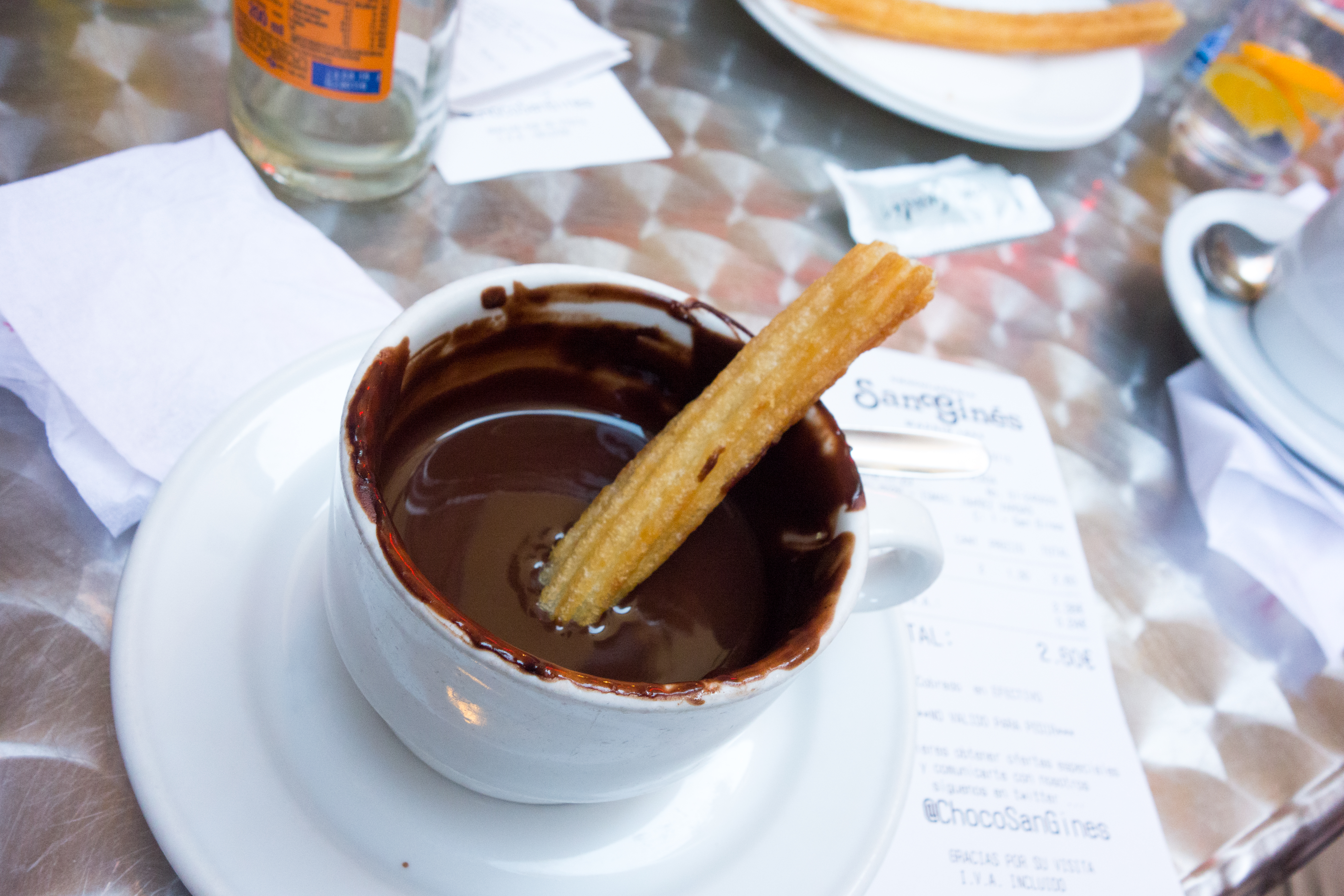
Spanish churro

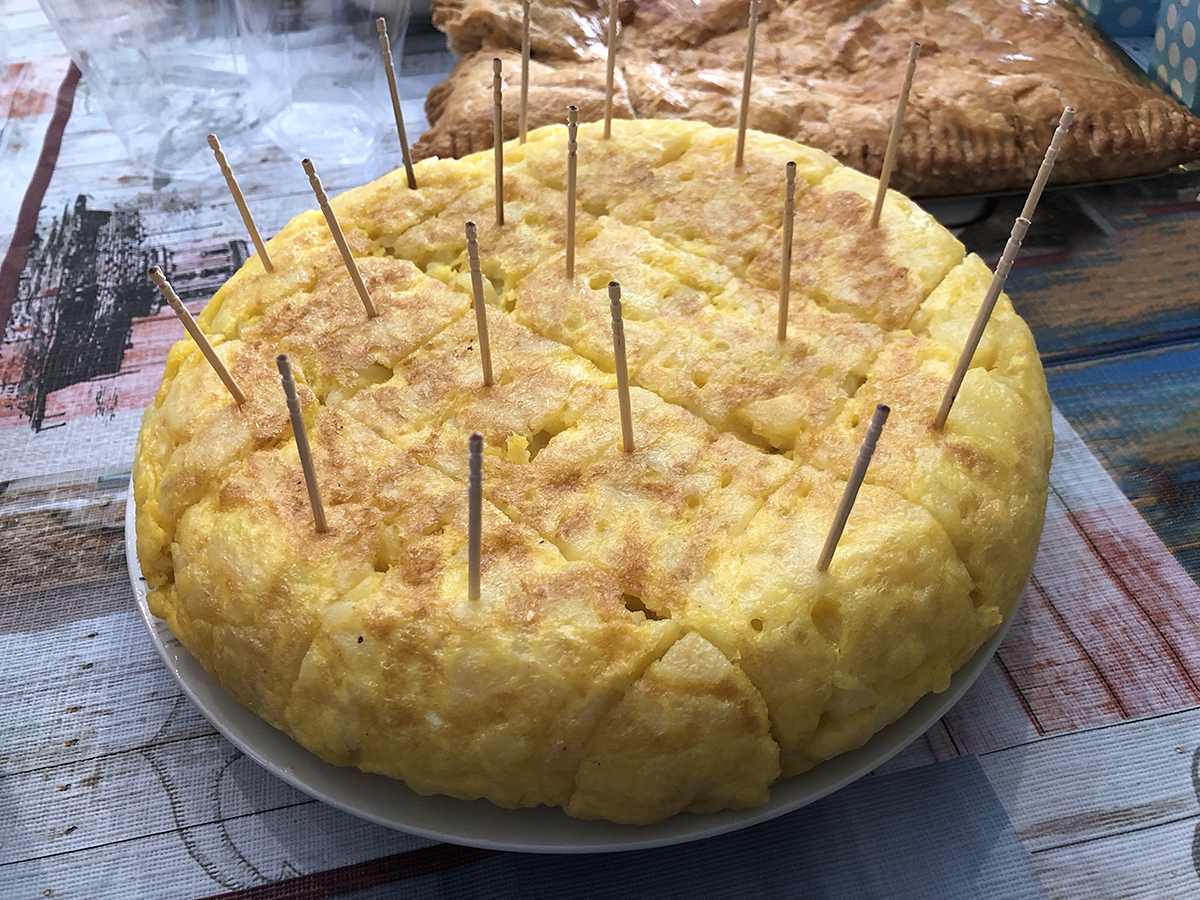
Spanish omelette

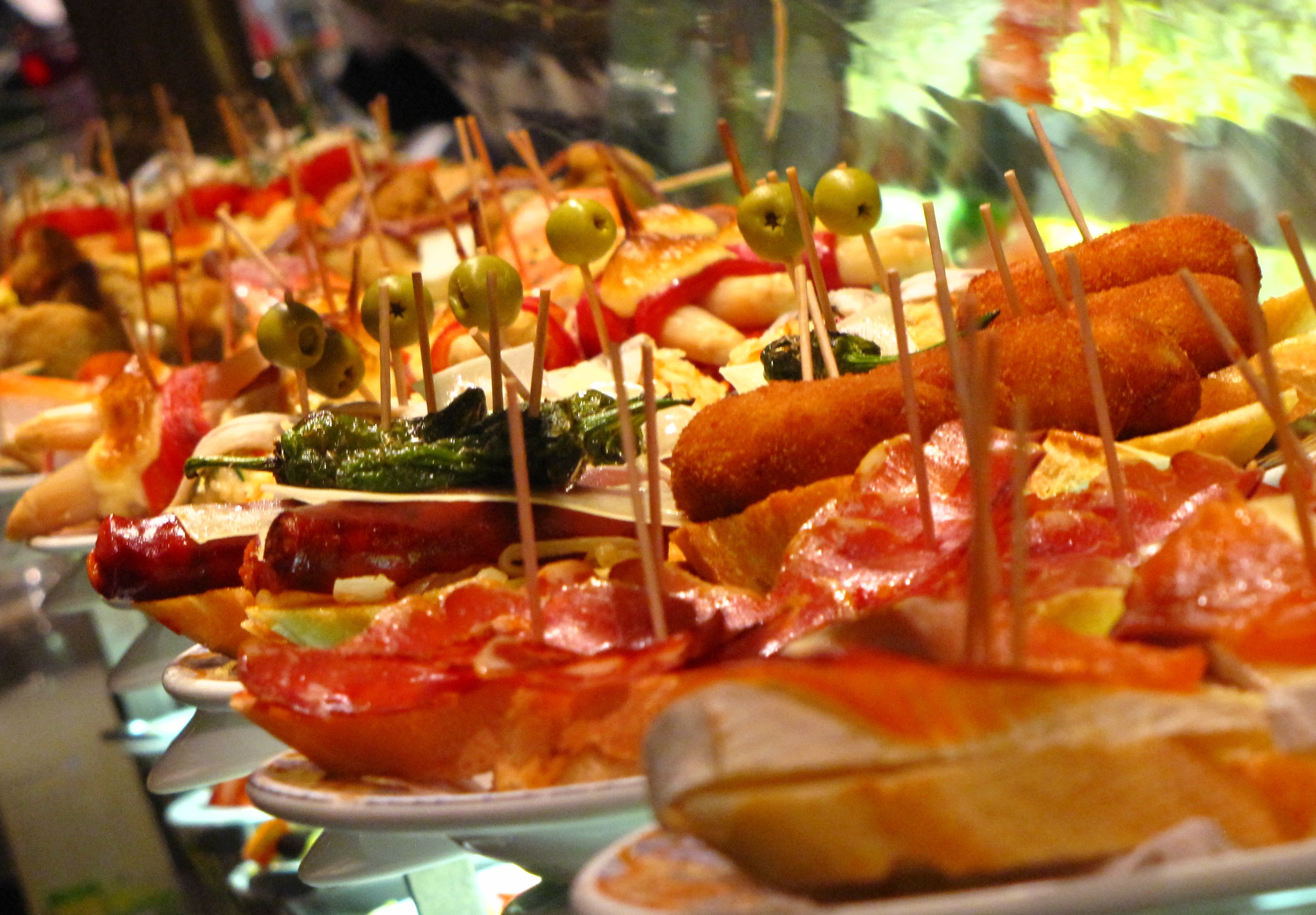
Spanish tapas

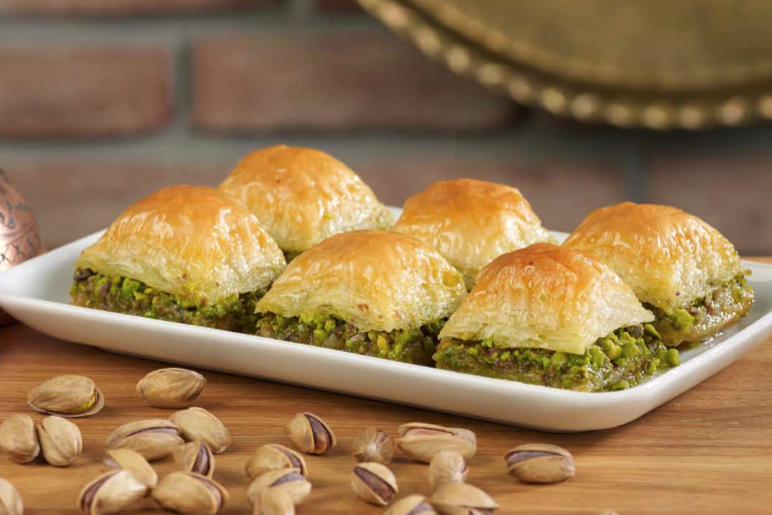
Turkish baklava

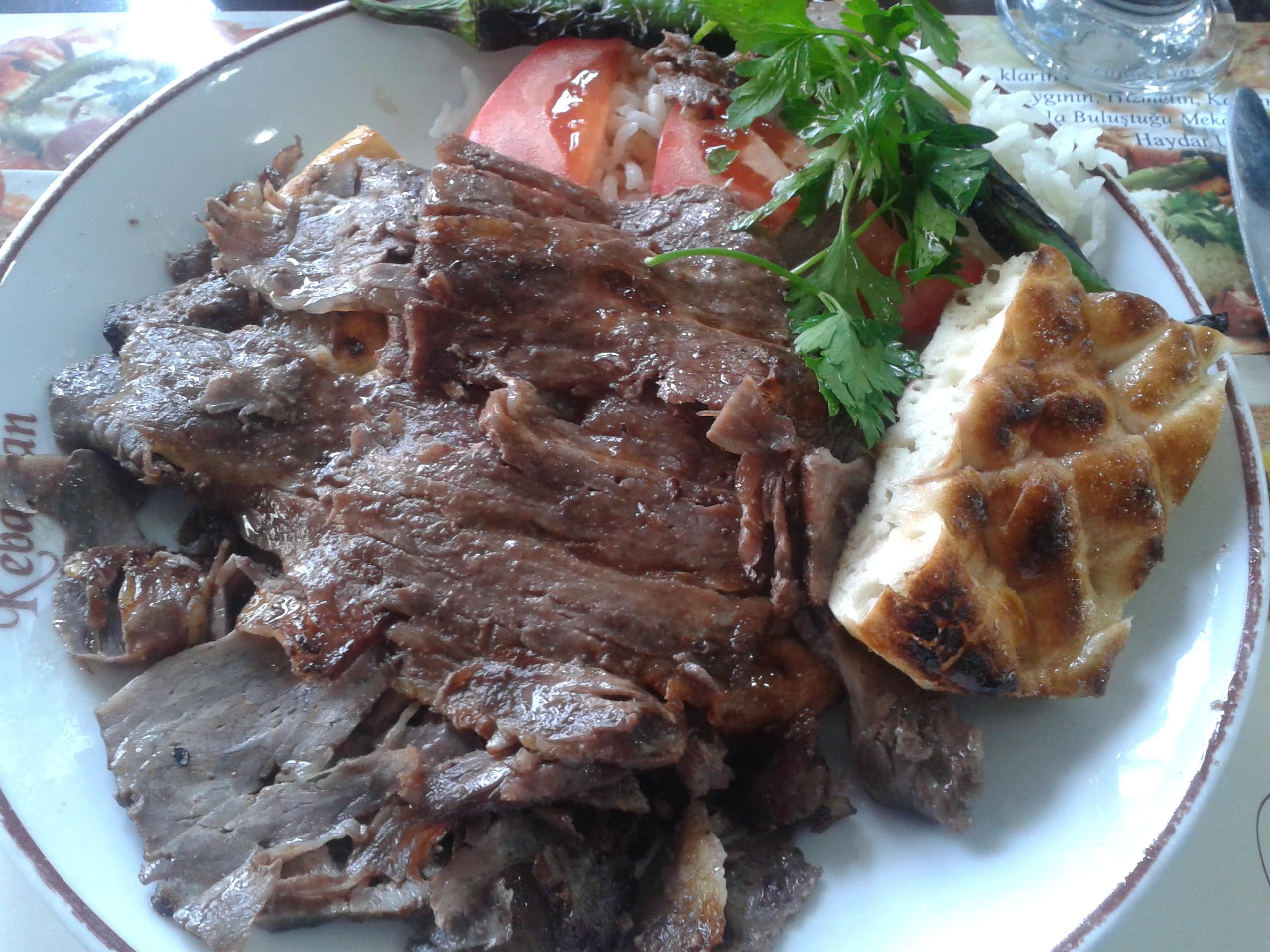
Turkish doner kebab

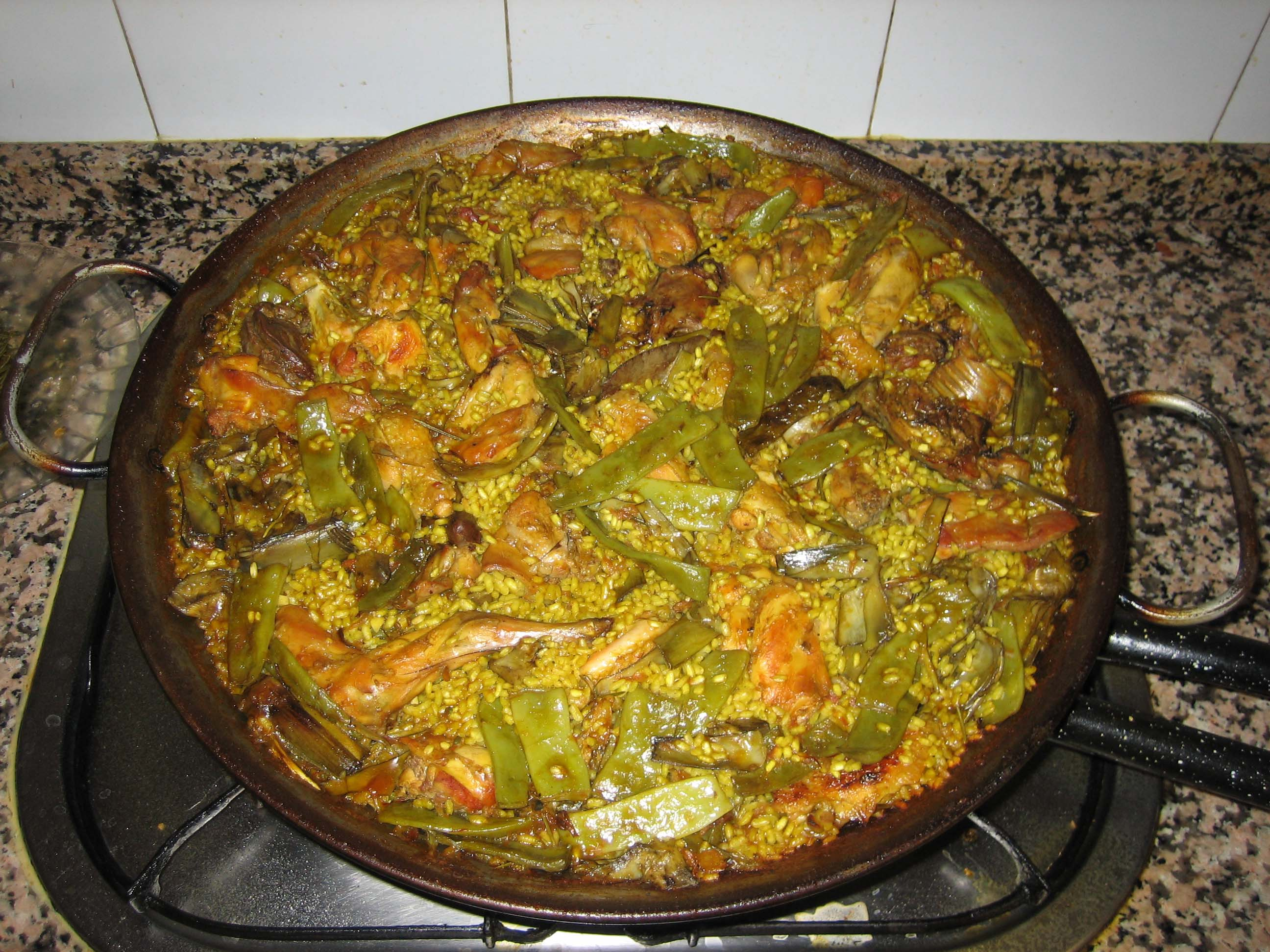
Valencian paella

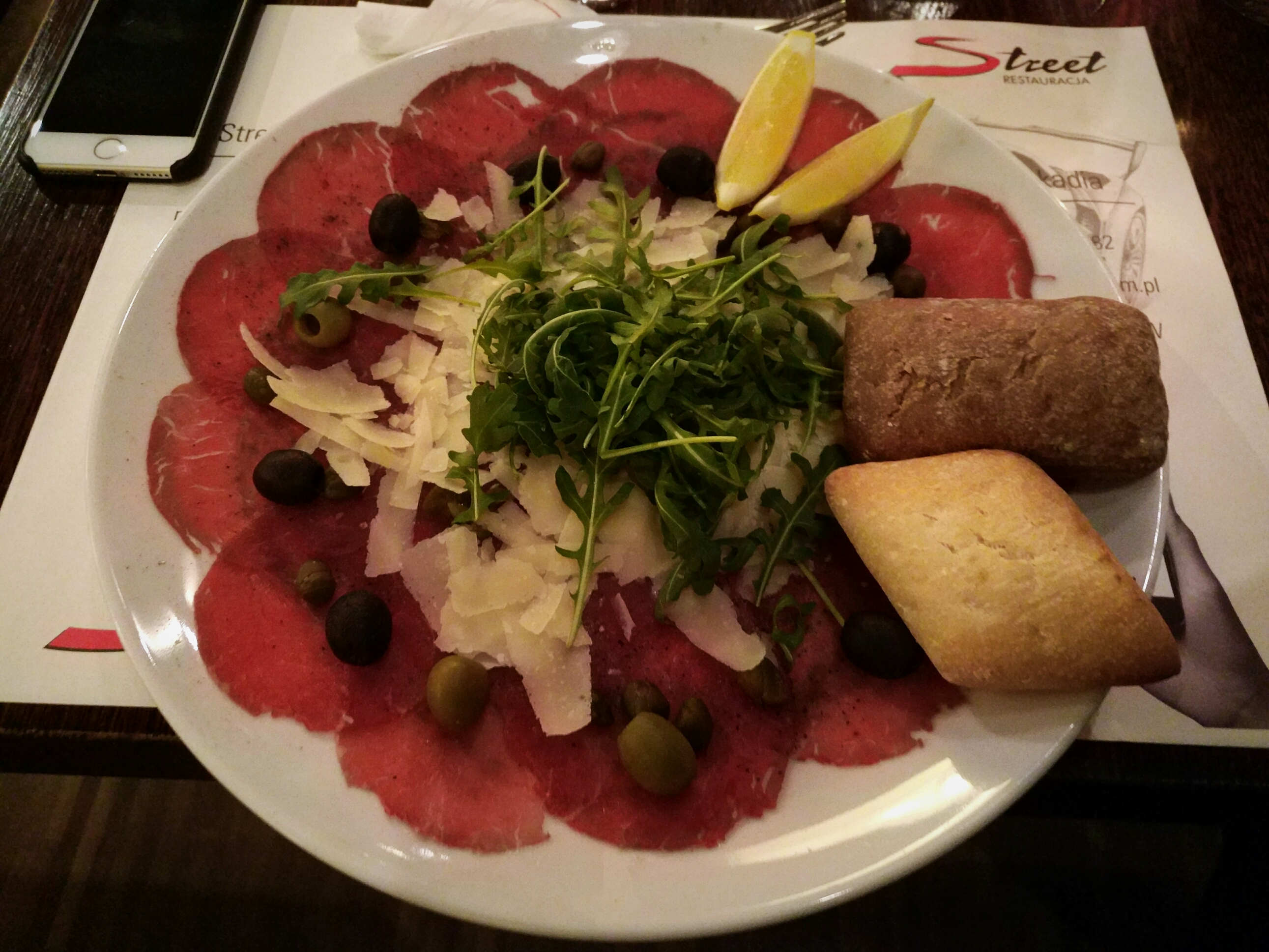
Venetian carpaccio

== Central European cuisines ==
- Ashkenazi Jewish cuisine
- (Austria) Austrian cuisine
  - (Vienna) Viennese cuisine
- (Czech Republic) Czech cuisine
  - (Moravia) Moravian cuisine
- (Germany) German cuisine
  - (Grand Duchy of Baden) Baden cuisine
  - (Bavaria) Bavarian cuisine
  - (Berlin) Berliner cuisine
  - Brandenburg cuisine
  - (Franconia) Franconian cuisine
  - Hamburg cuisine
  - (Hesse) Hessian cuisine
  - (Lower Saxony) Lower Saxon cuisine
  - Mecklenburg cuisine
  - Palatine cuisine
  - (Pomeranian Voivodeship) Pomeranian cuisine
  - (Saxony) Saxon cuisine
    - Ore Mountain cuisine
  - Schleswig-Holstein cuisine
  - Swabian cuisine
- (Hungary) Hungarian cuisine
- (Liechtenstein) Liechtensteiner cuisine
- (Poland) Polish cuisine
  - Lublin cuisine
  - (Opolskie Voivodeship) Opole cuisine
  - (Podlaskie Voivodeship) Podlaskie cuisine
  - (Silesia) Silesian cuisine
  - (Świętokrzyskie Voivodeship) Świętokrzyskie cuisine
- (Slovakia) Slovak cuisine
- (Slovenia) Slovenian cuisine
- (Switzerland) Swiss cuisine
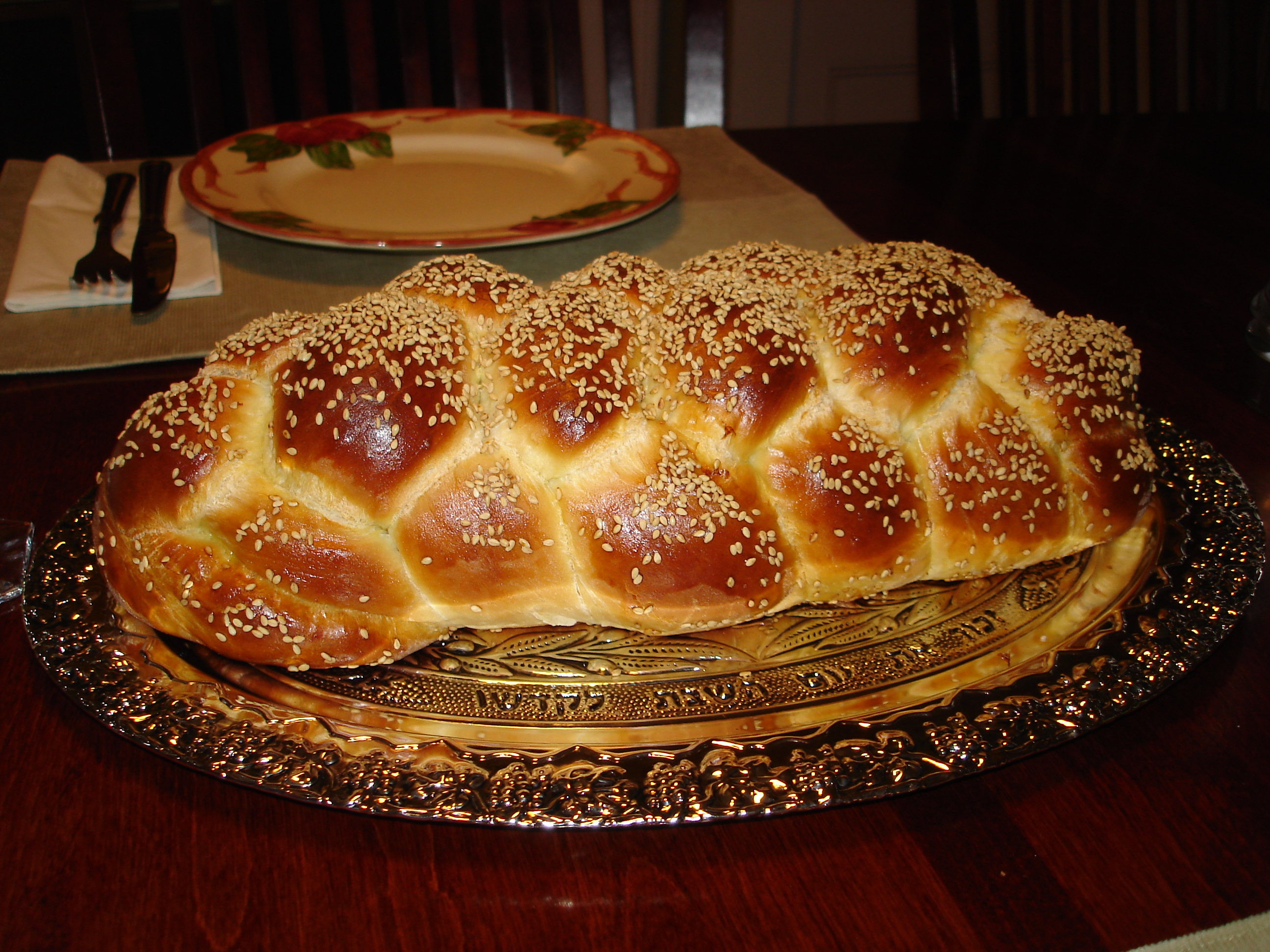
Ashkenazi Jewish challah

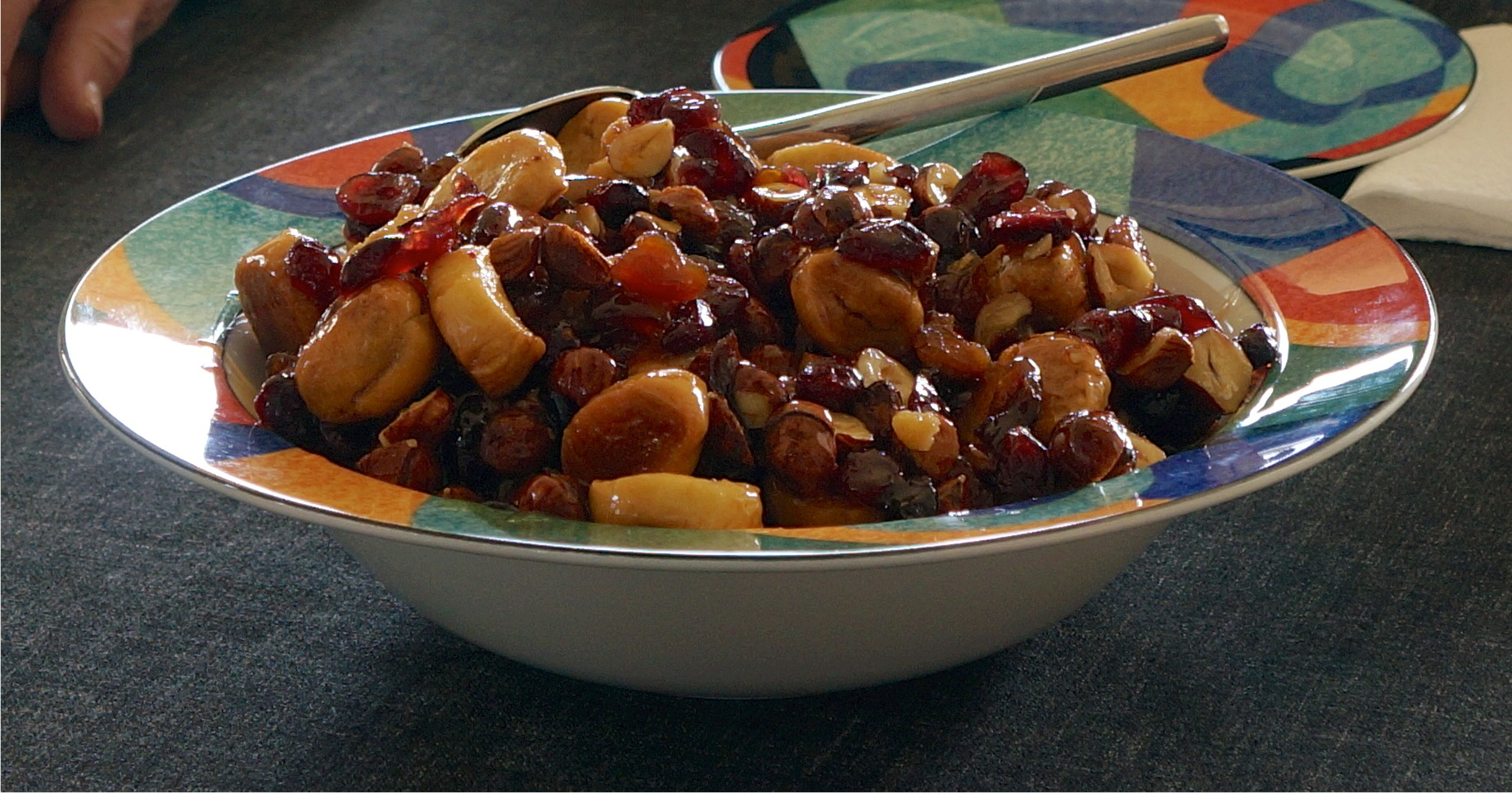
Ashkenazi Jewish teiglach

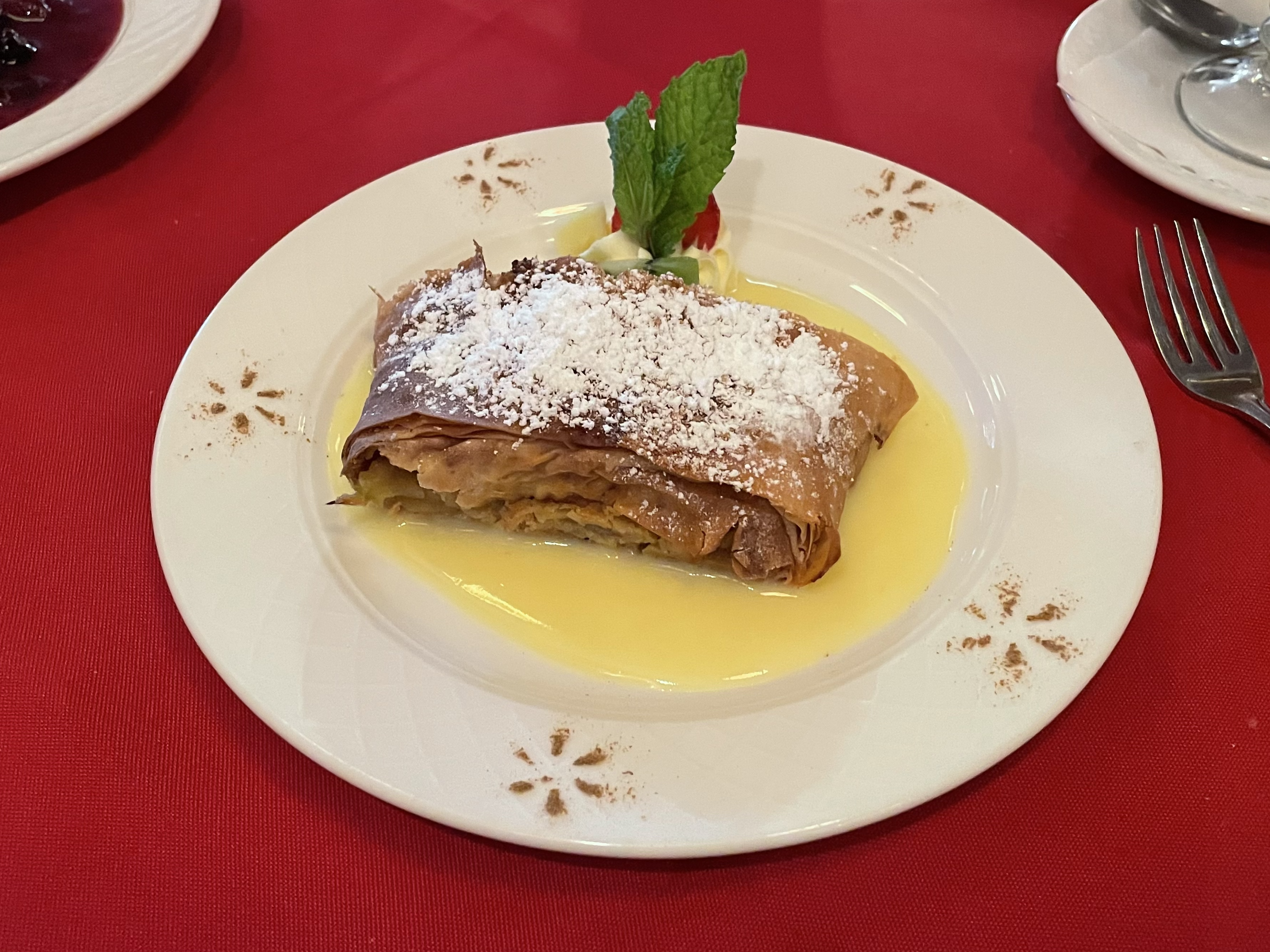
Austrian strudel

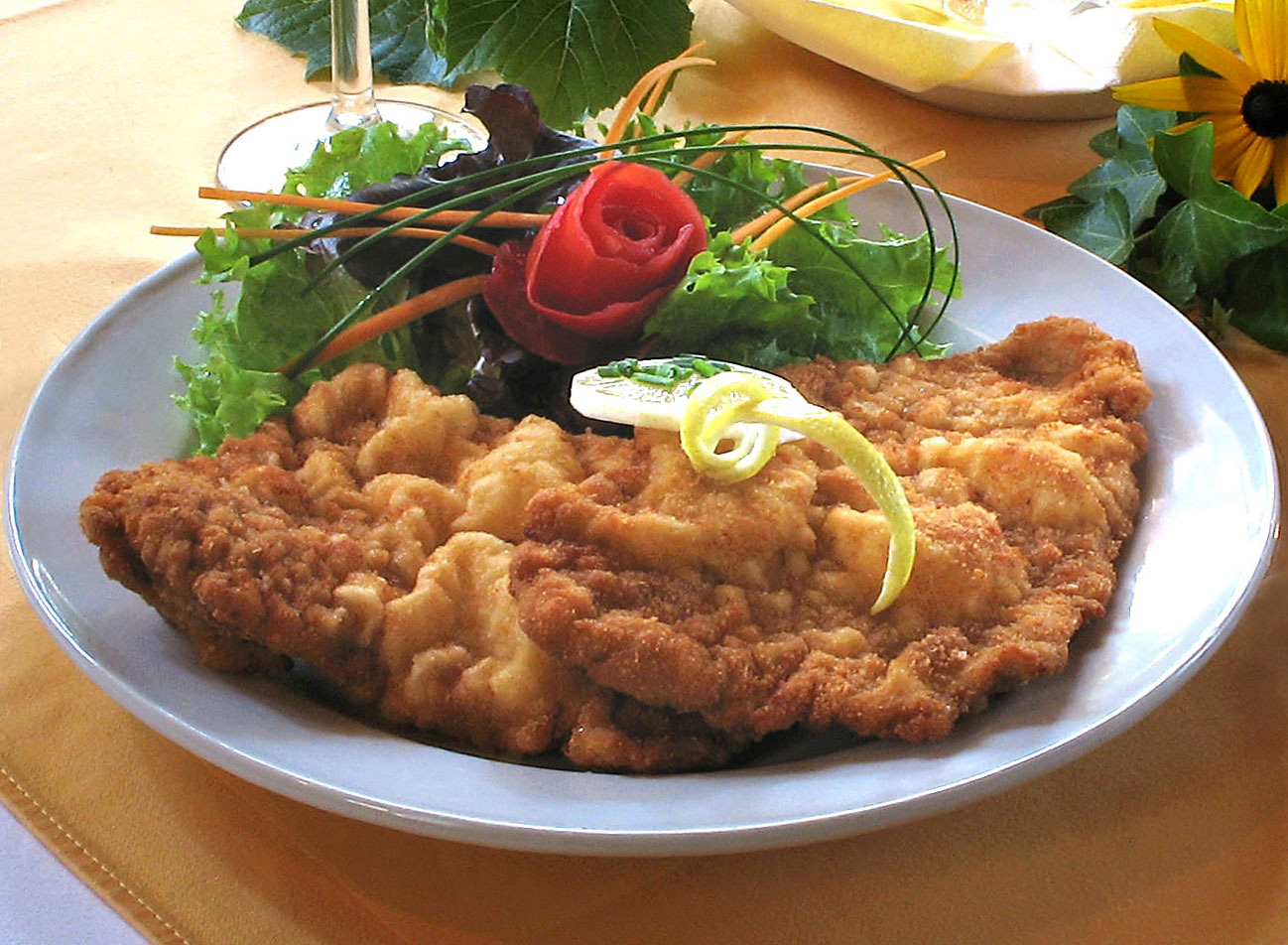
Austrian Wiener Schnitzel

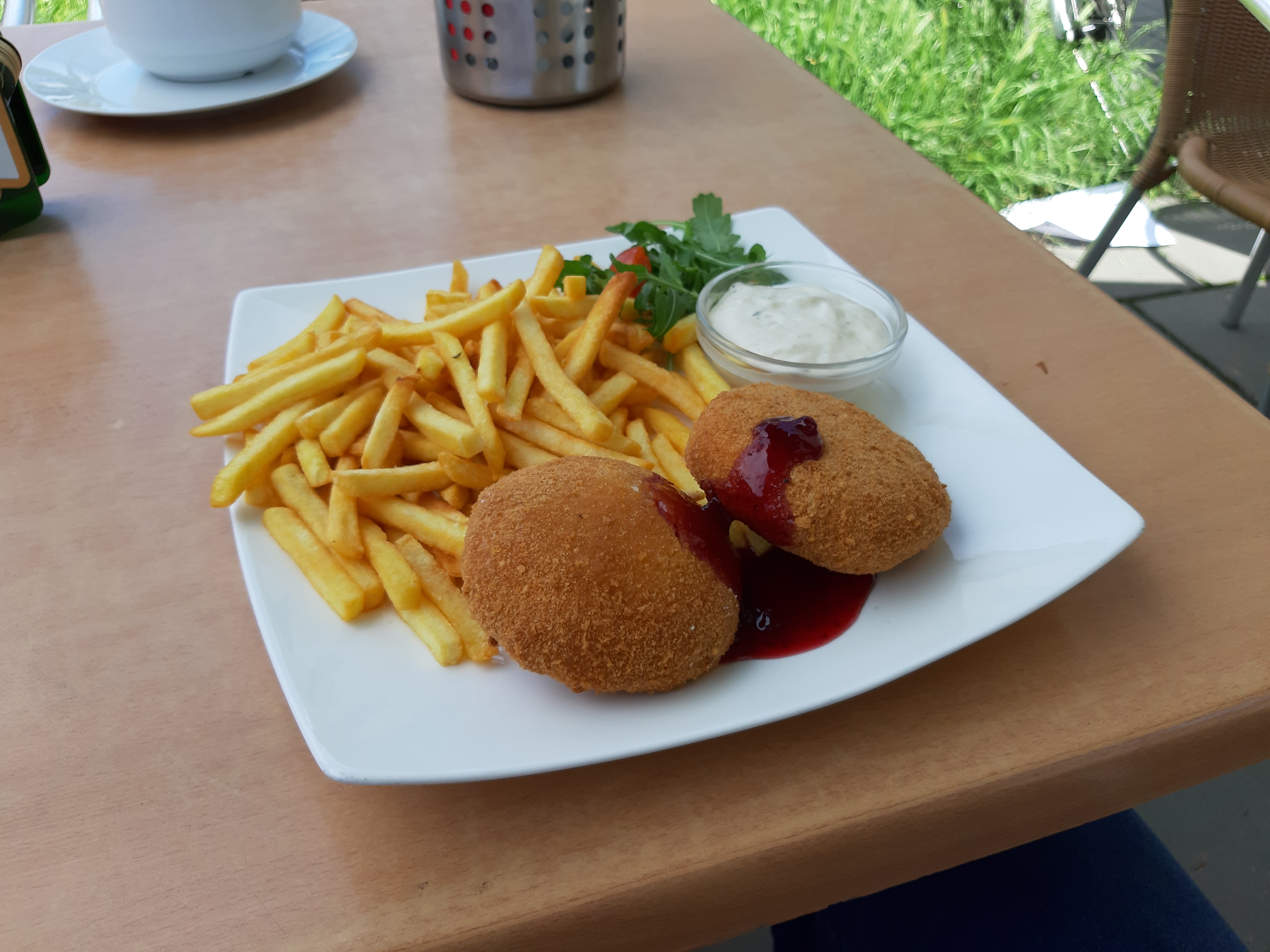
Czech smažený sýr

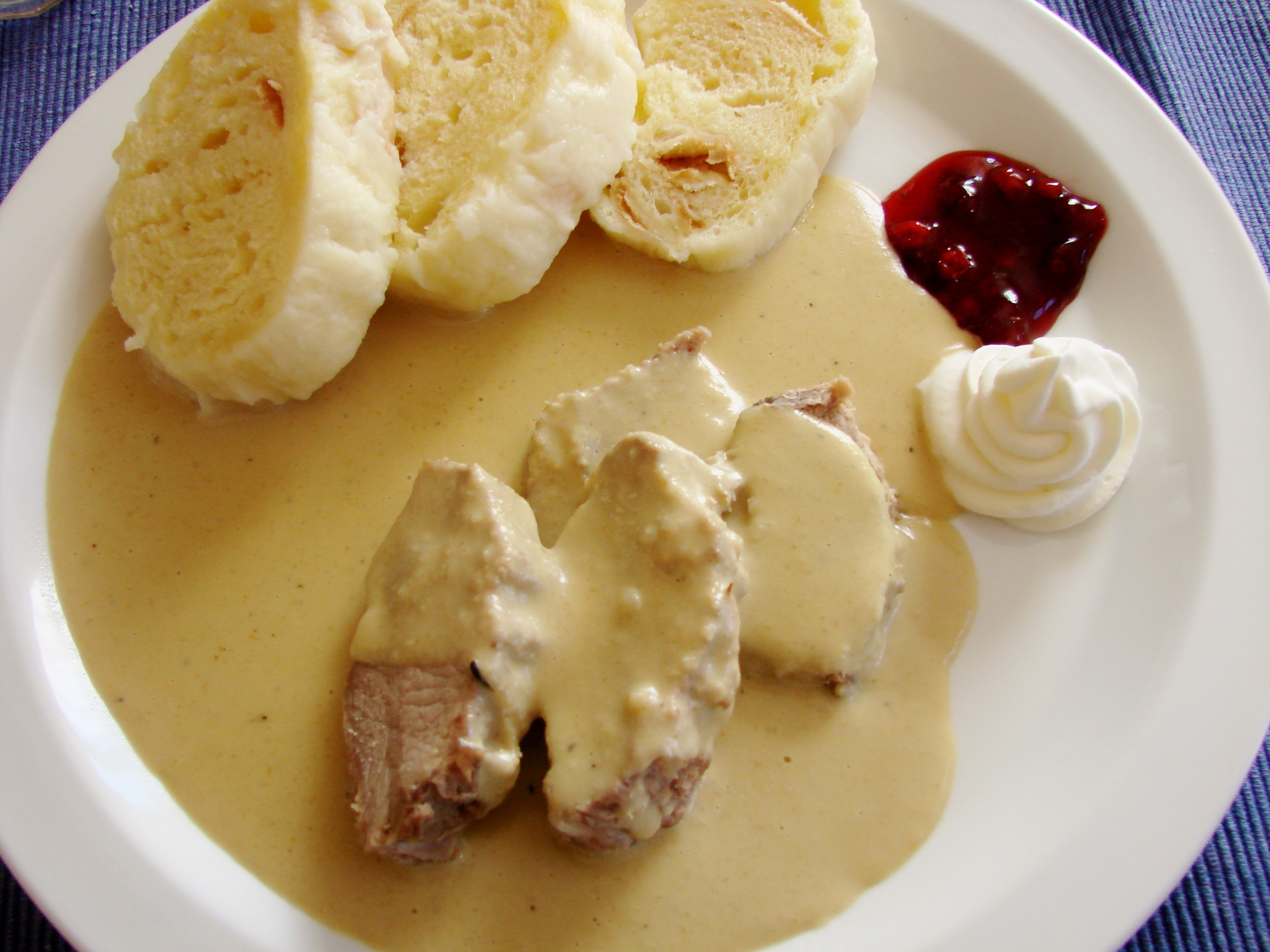
Czech svíčková

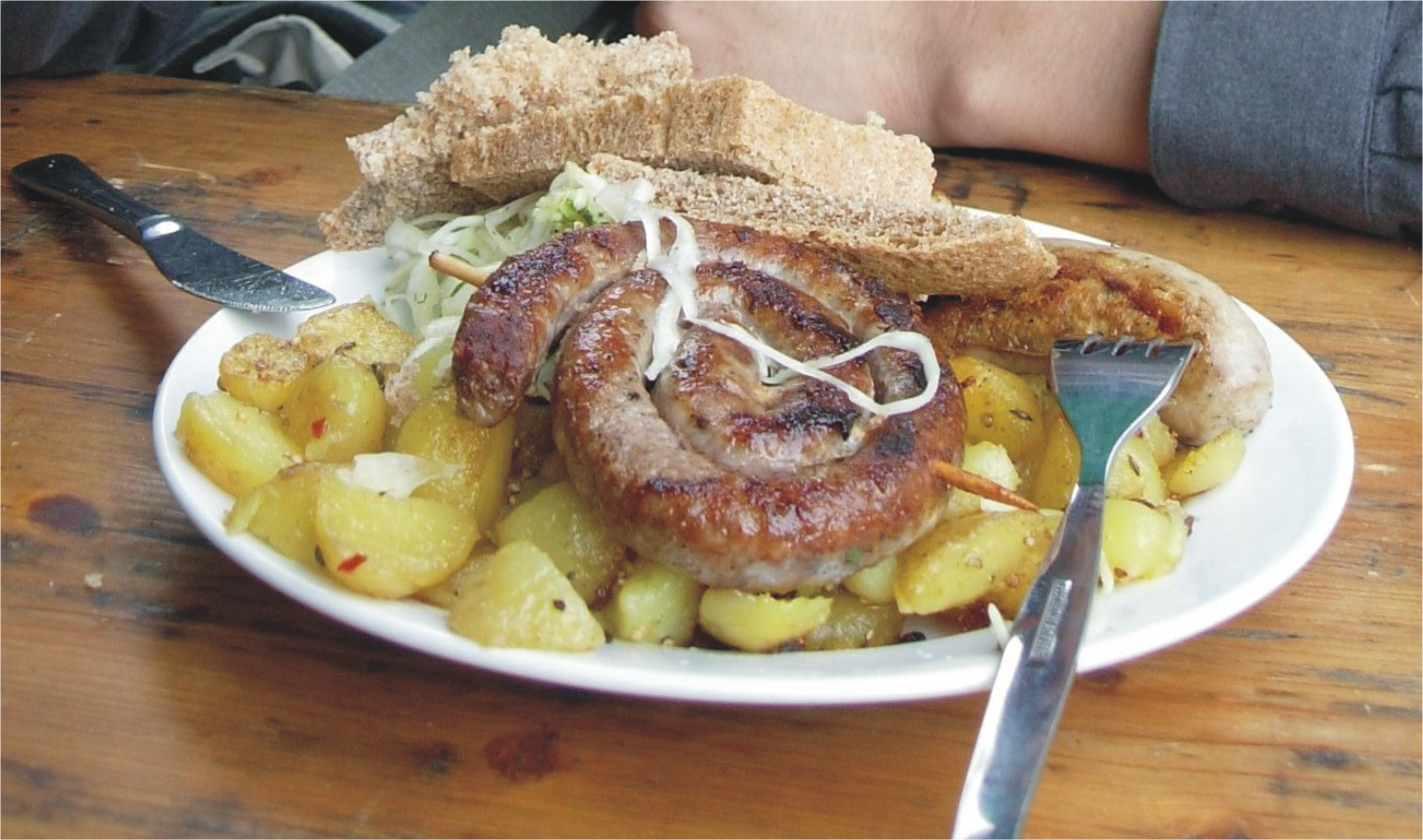
German bratwurst

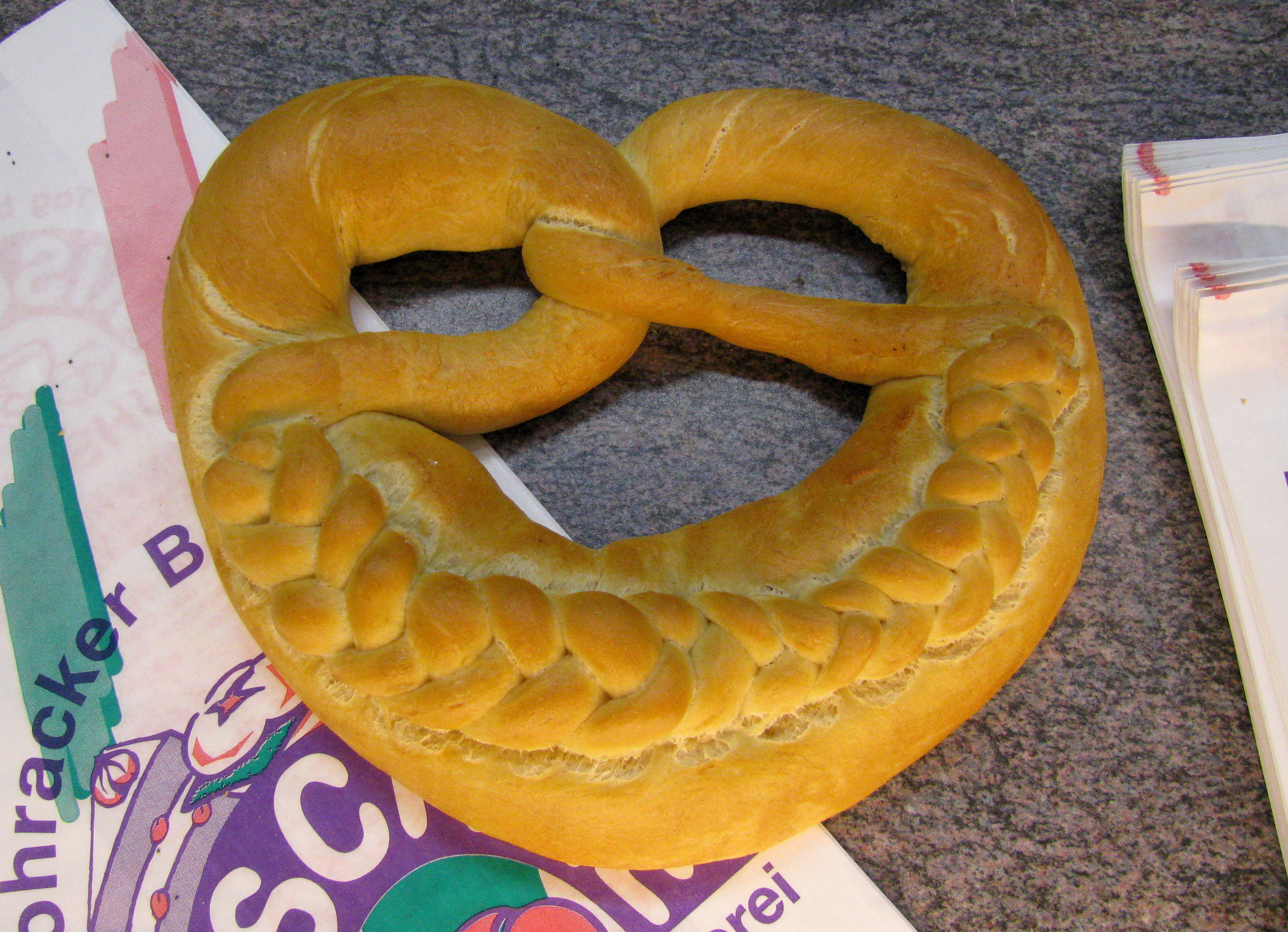
German pretzel

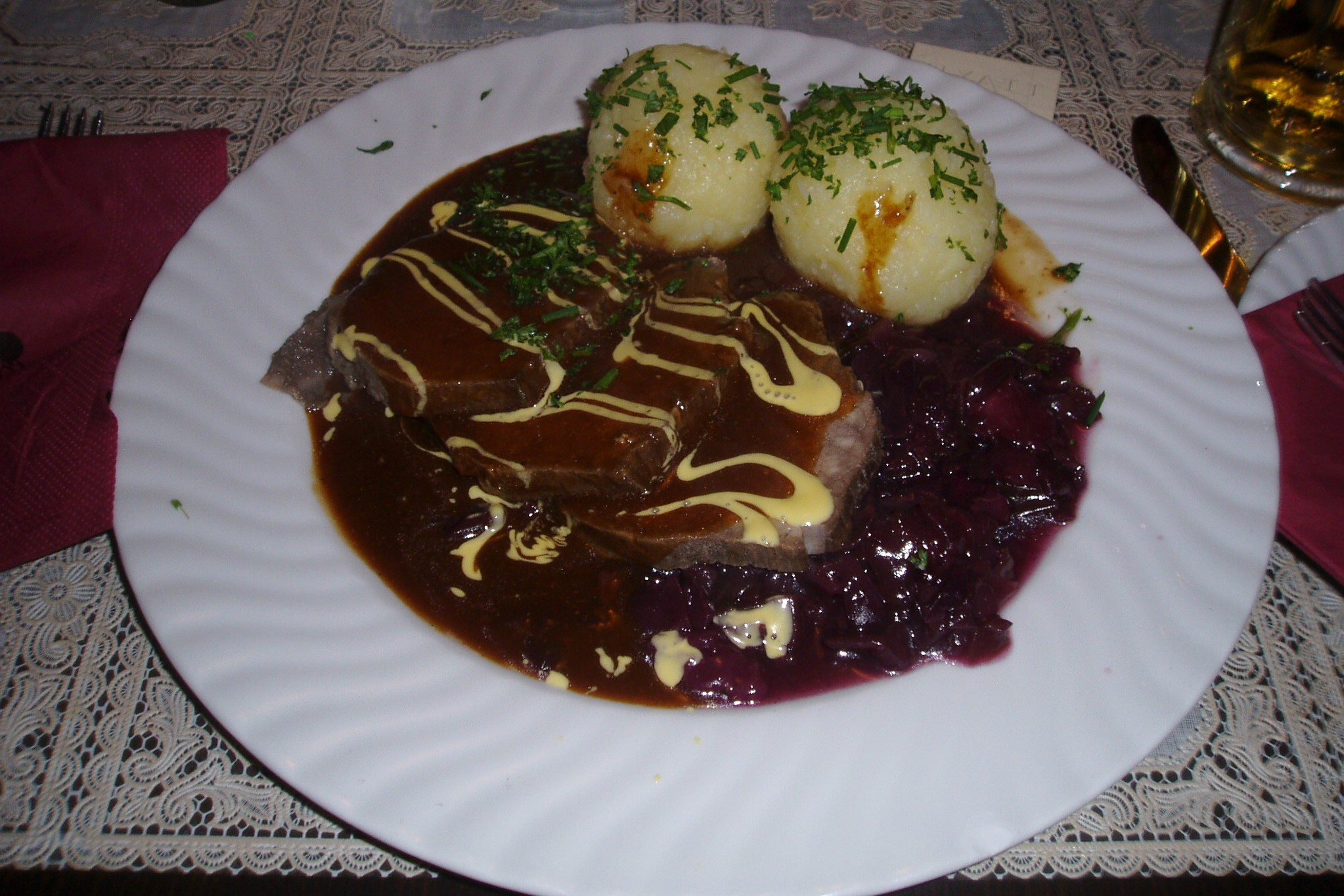
German Sauerbraten

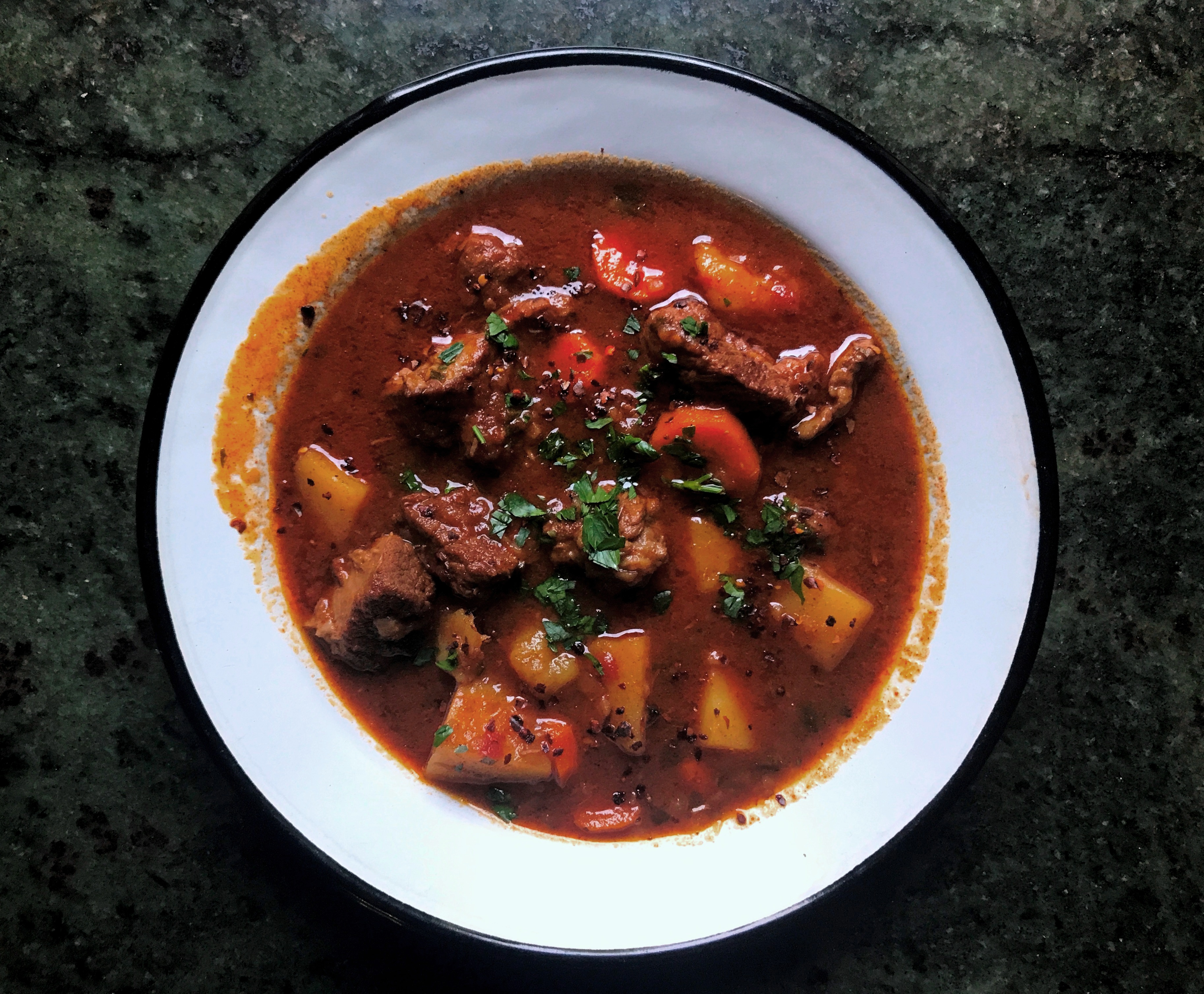
Hungarian goulash

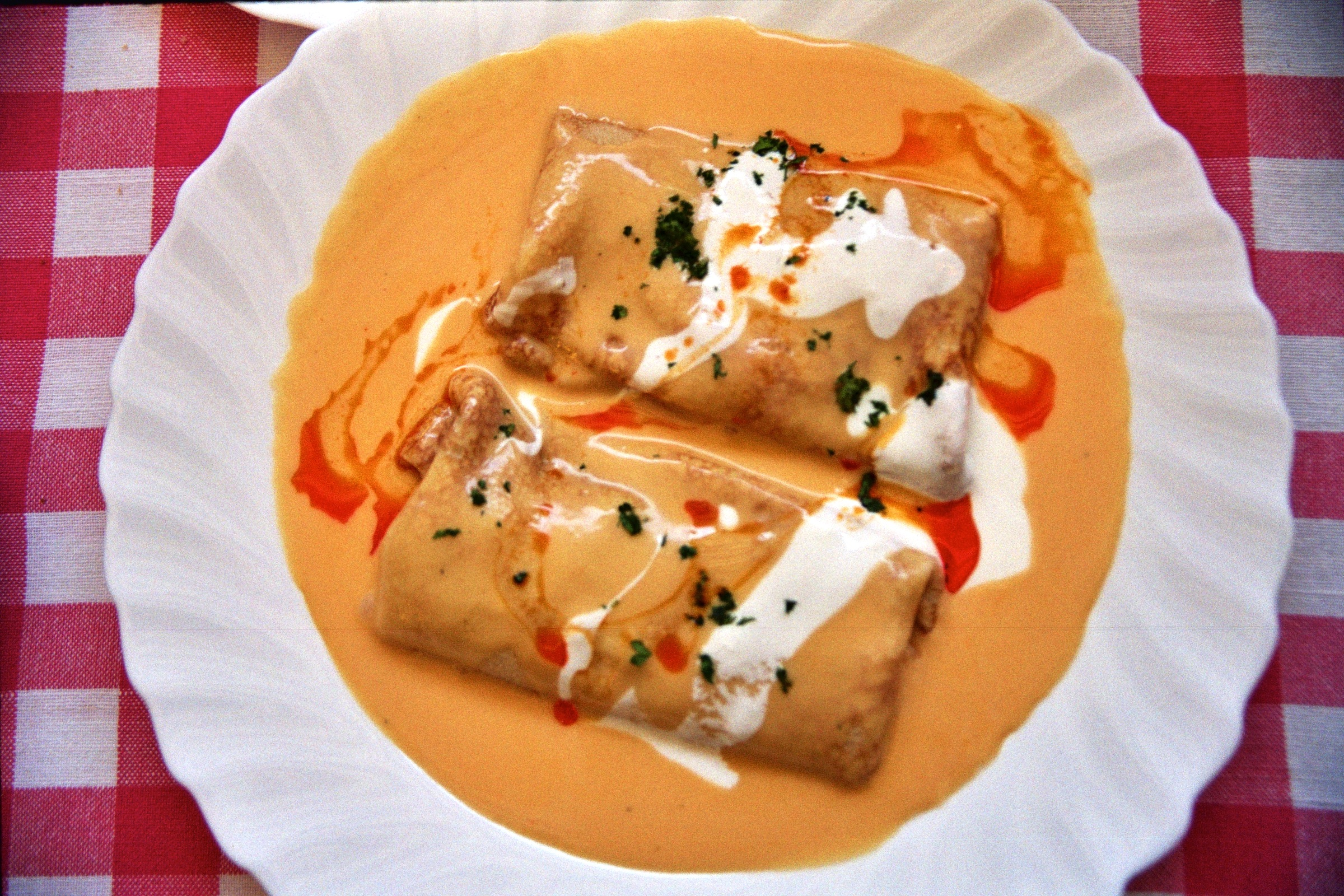
Hungarian Hortobágyi palacsinta

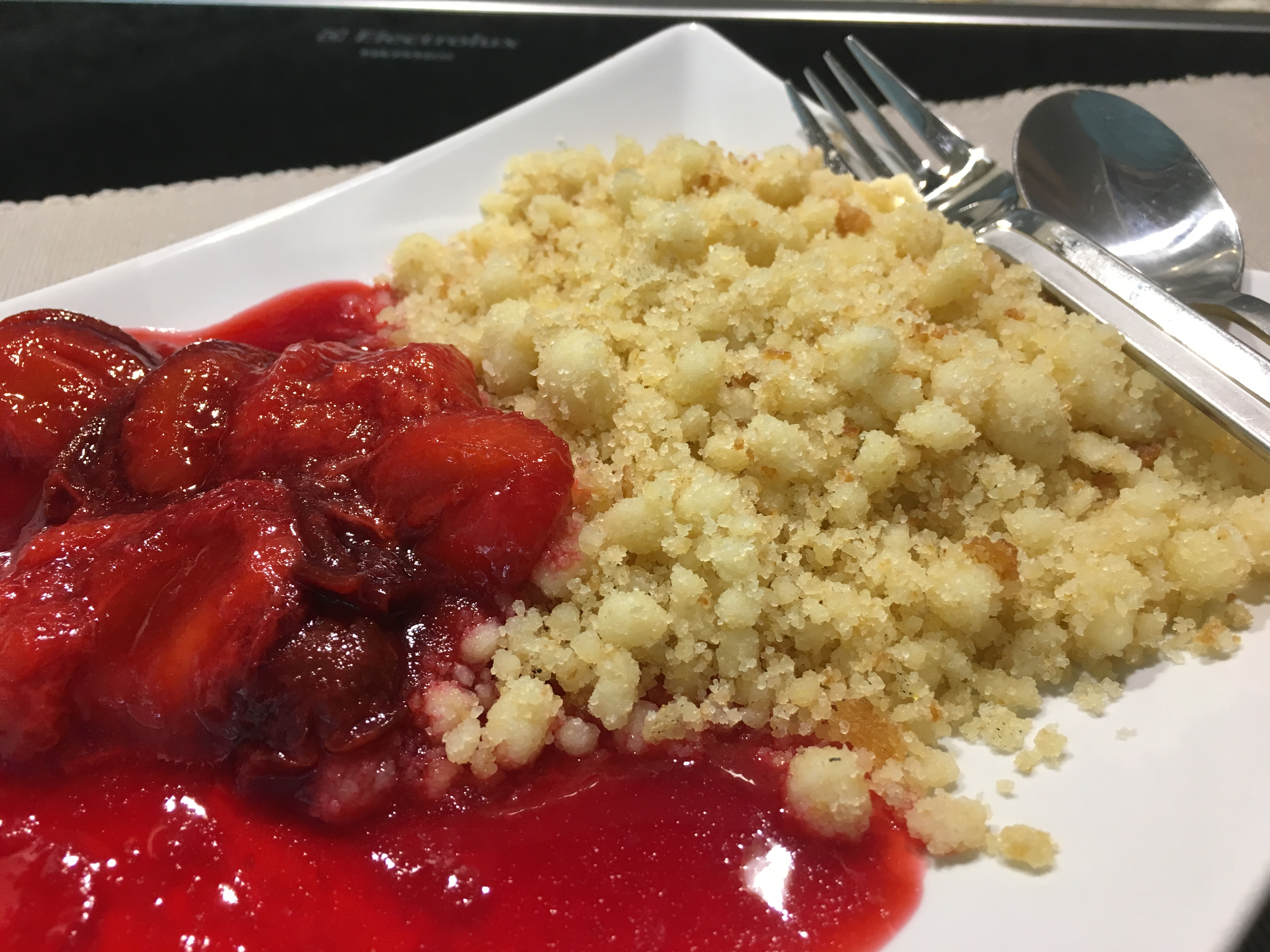
Liechtensteiner Rheintaler Ribelmais

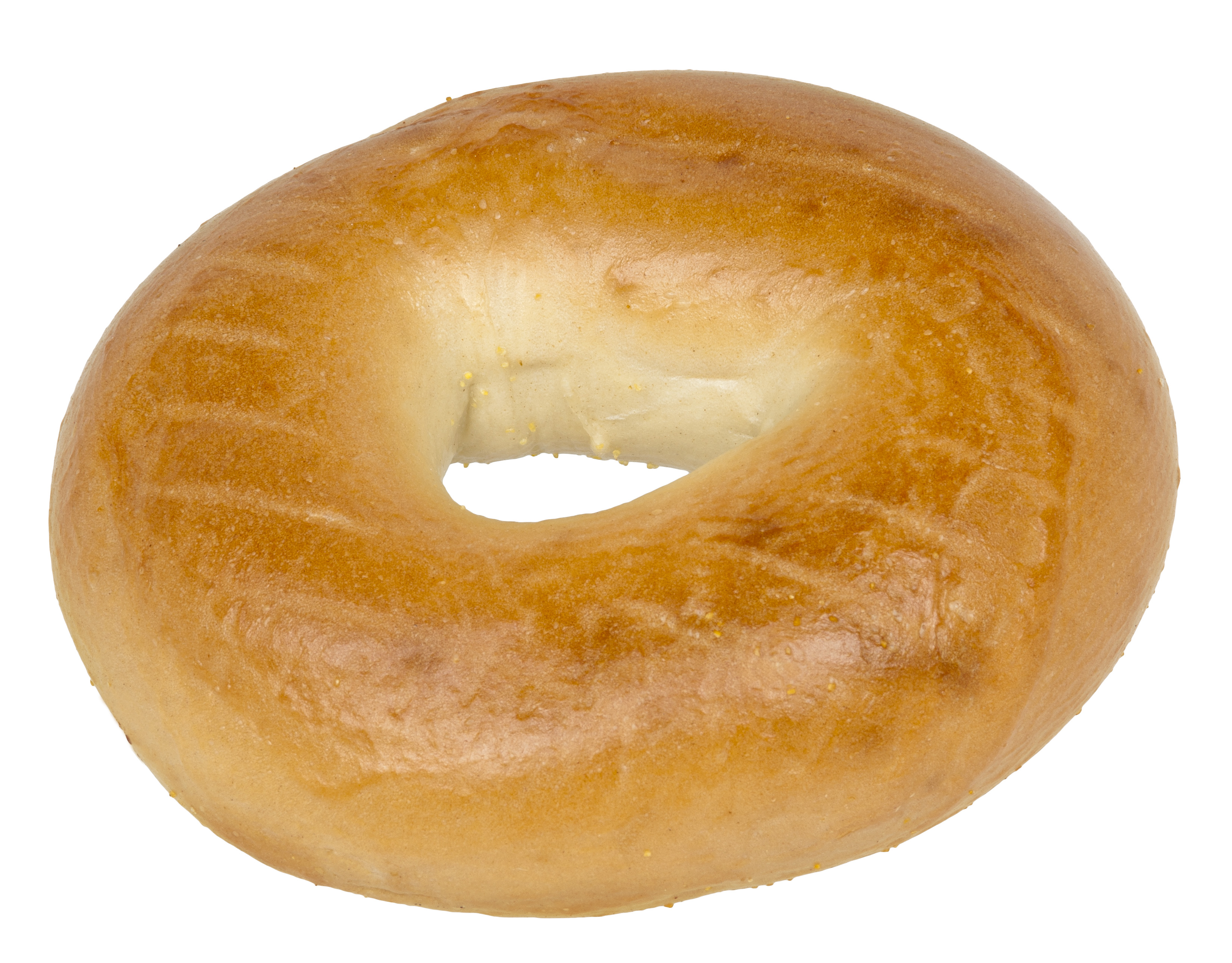
Polish bagel

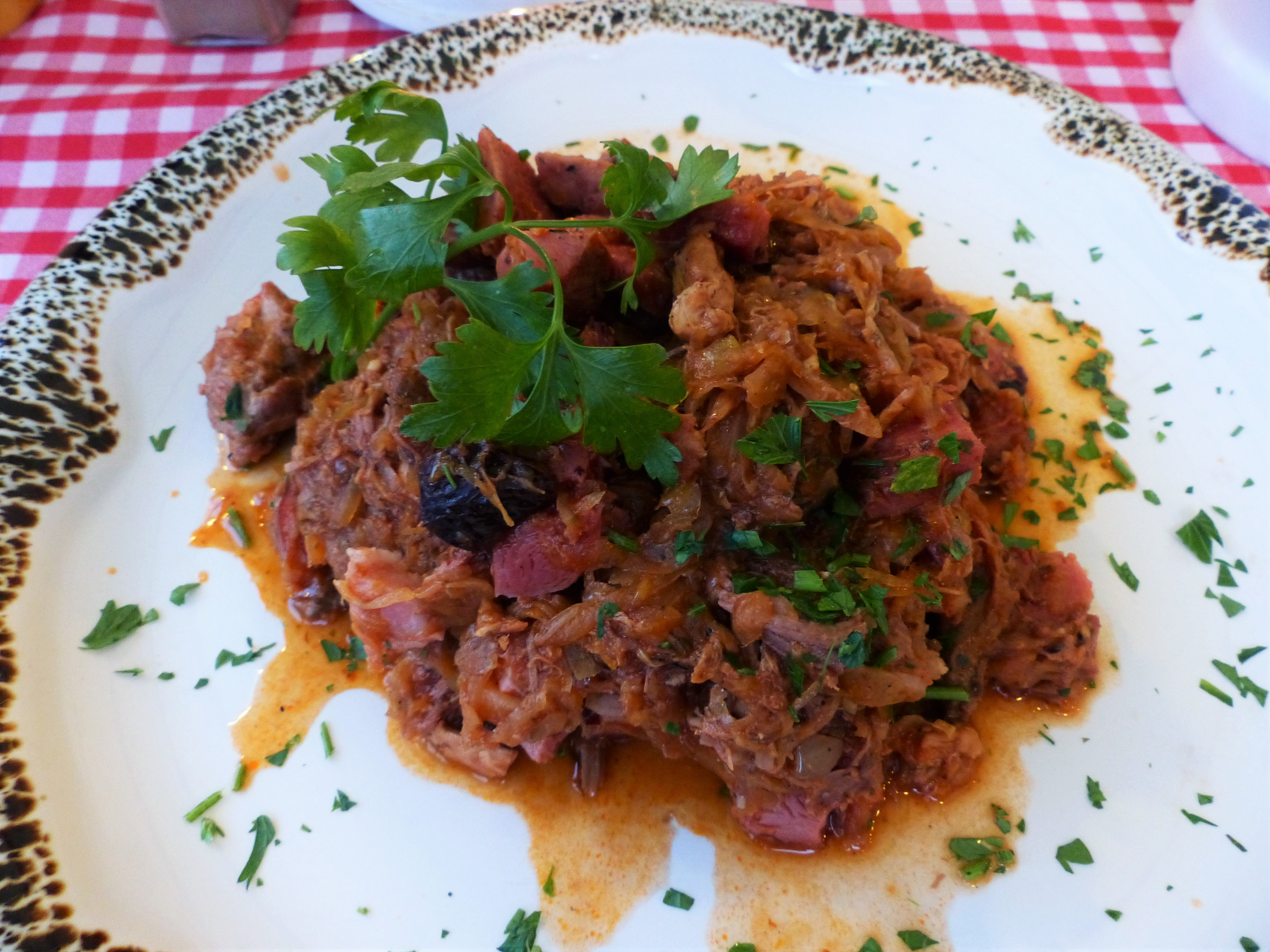
Polish bigos

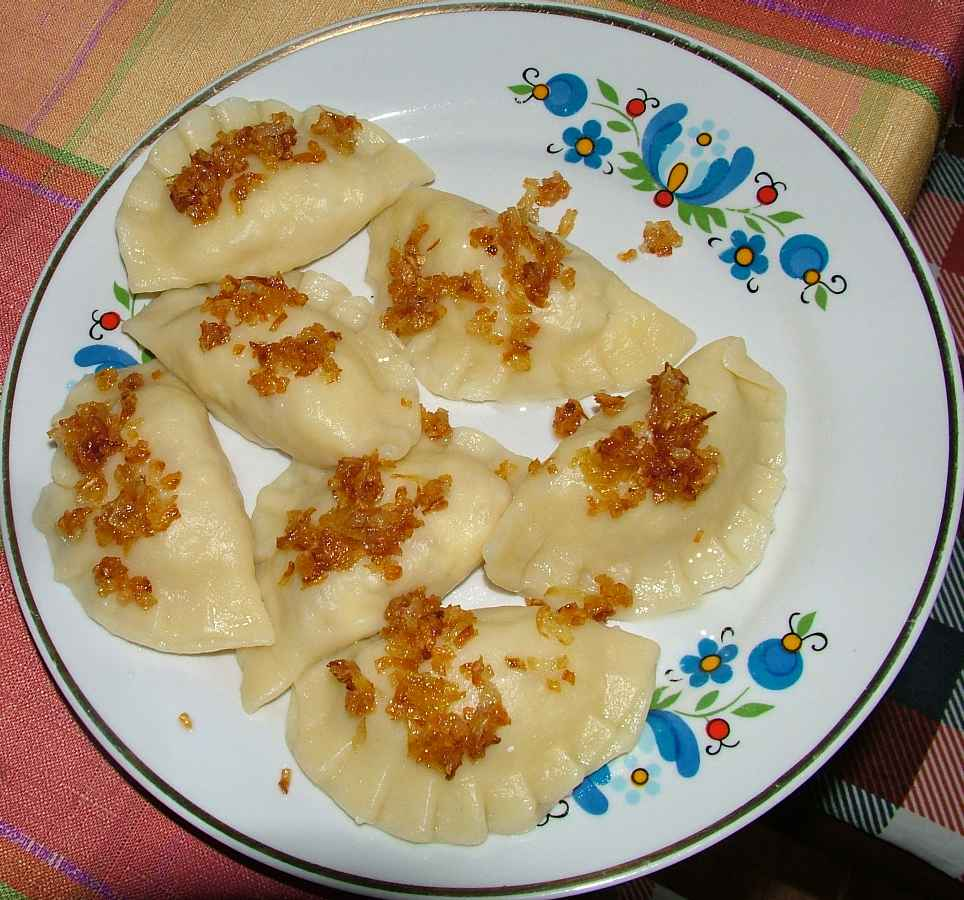
Polish pierogi

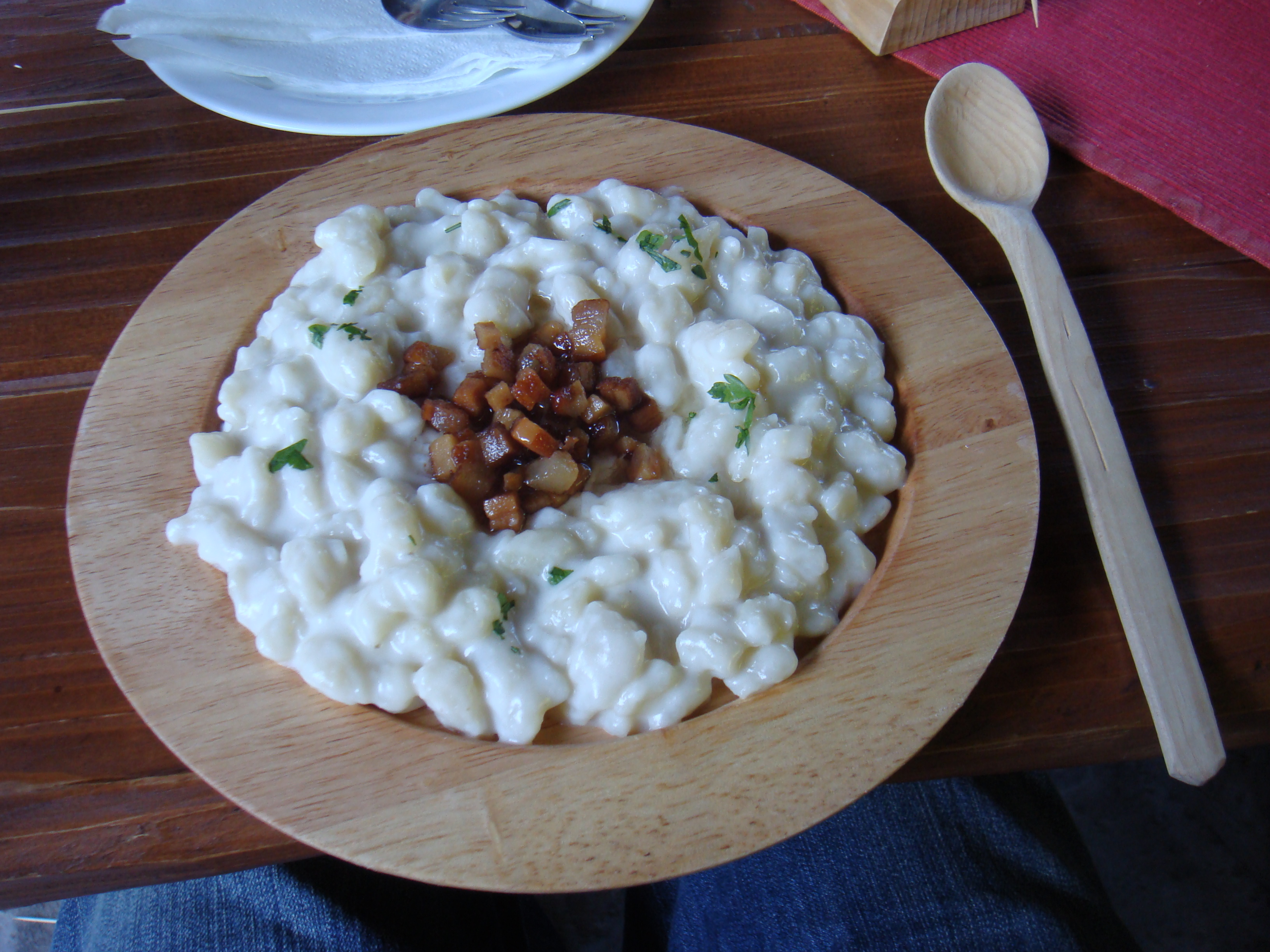
Slovak bryndzové halušky

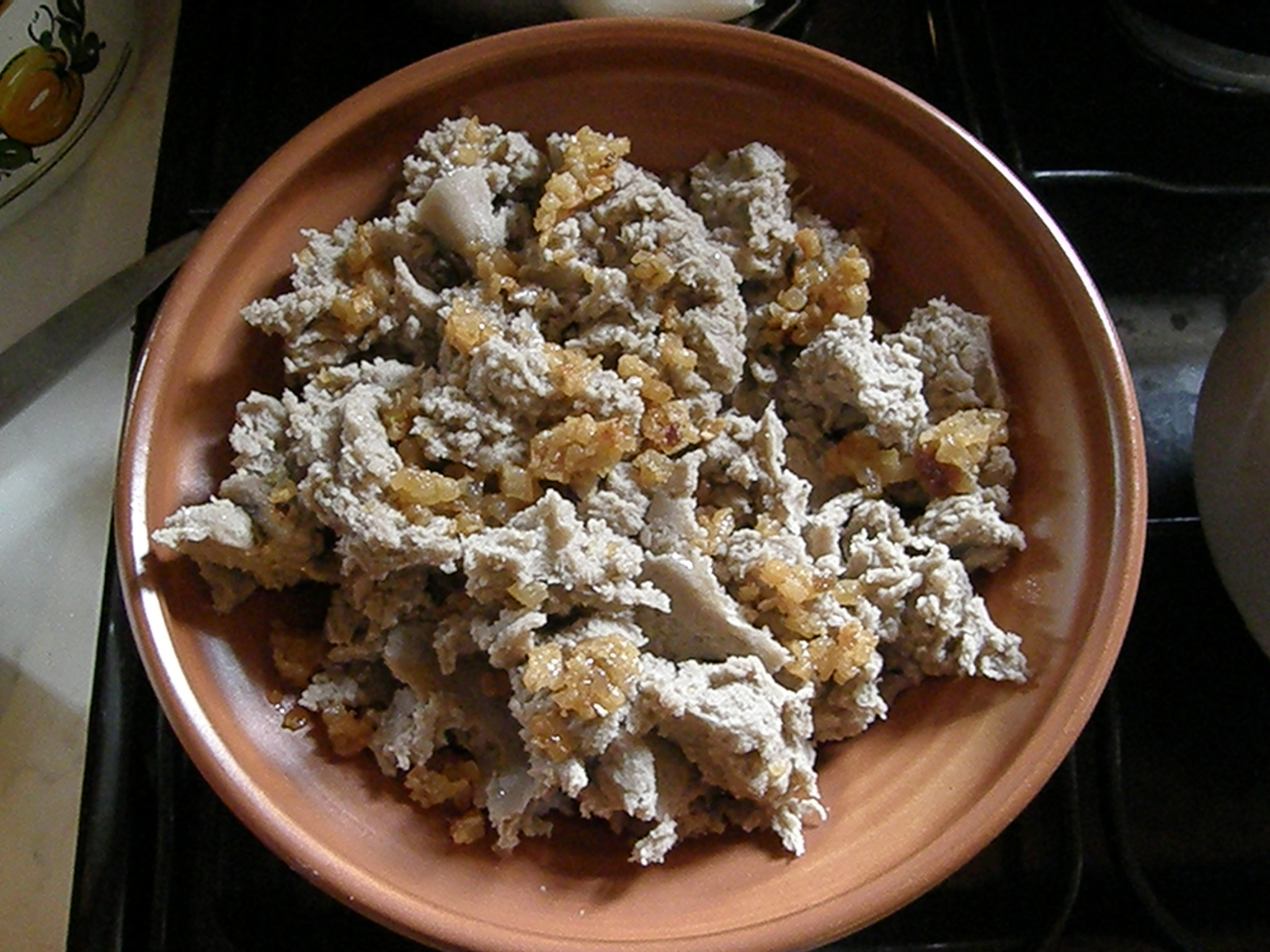
Slovenian ajdovi žganci

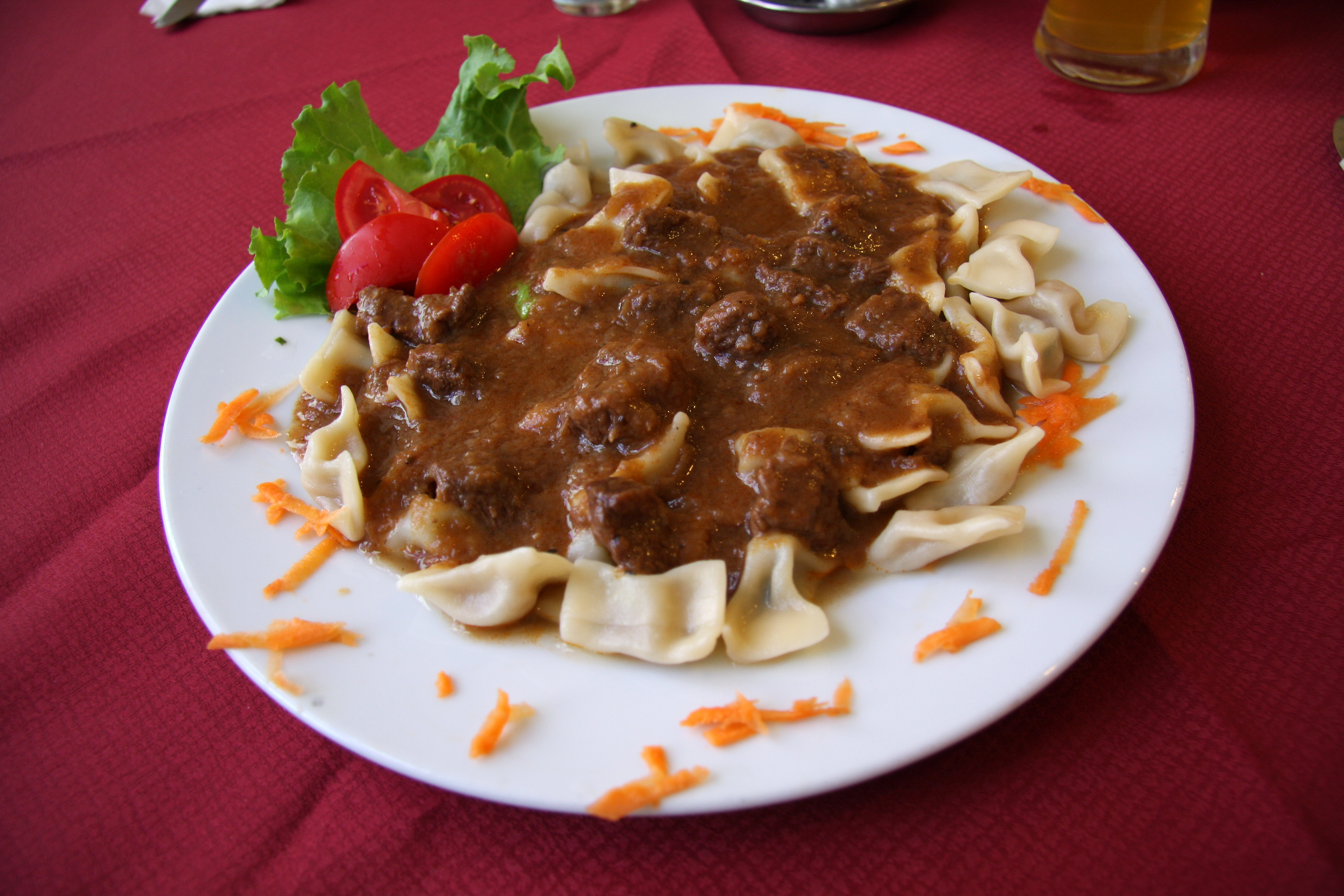
Slovenian idrijski žlikrofi

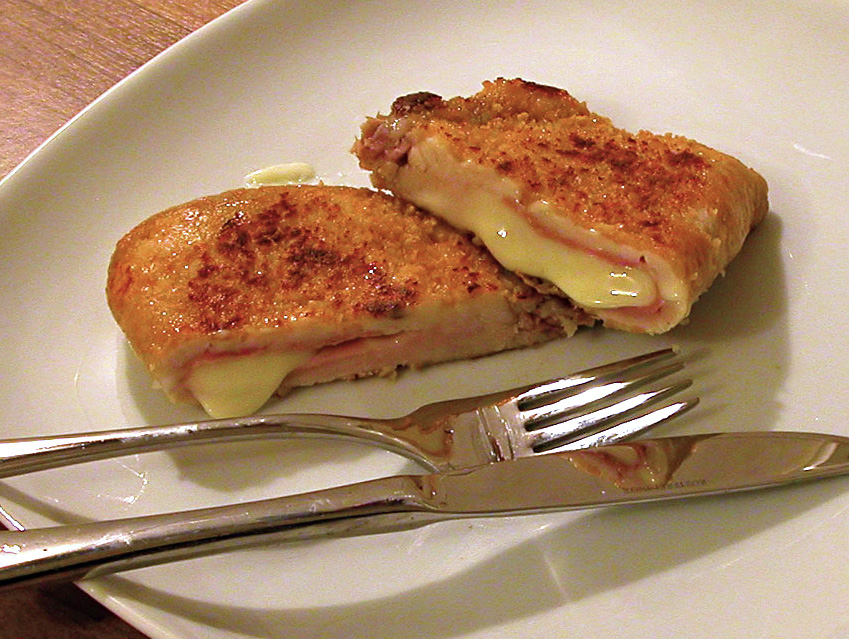
Swiss cordon bleu

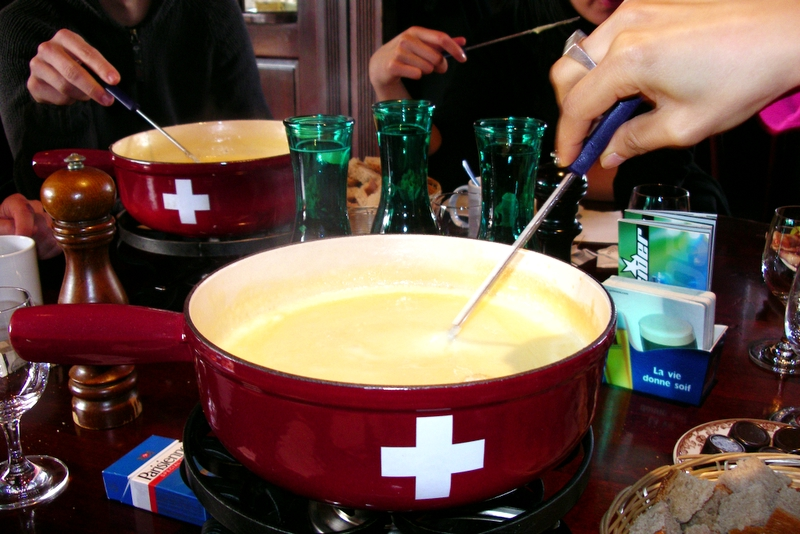
Swiss fondue

== Eastern European cuisines ==
- (Armenia) Armenian cuisine
- (Azerbaijan) Azerbaijani cuisine
- (Belarus) Belarusian cuisine
- (Bulgaria) Bulgarian cuisine
- Cossack cuisine
- (Georgia (country)) Georgian cuisine
  - (Abkhazia) Abkhazian cuisine
  - (South Ossetia) Ossetian cuisine
- (Kazakhstan) Kazakh cuisine
- (Moldova) Moldovan cuisine
  - (Gagauzia) Gagauz cuisine
- (Romania) Romanian cuisine
  - Transylvanian Saxon cuisine
- (Russia) Russian cuisine
  - (Bashkortostan) Bashkir cuisine
  - (Chechnya) Chechen cuisine
  - Circassian cuisine
  - (Kalmykia) Kalmykian cuisine
  - (Komi Republic) Komi cuisine
  - (Mordovia) Mordovian cuisine
  - (North Ossetia–Alania) Ossetian cuisine
  - (Tatarstan) Tatar cuisine
  - (Udmurtia) Udmurt cuisine
- (Ukraine) Ukrainian cuisine
  - (Autonomous Republic of Crimea) Crimean Tatar cuisine
  - (Odesa) Odesite cuisine
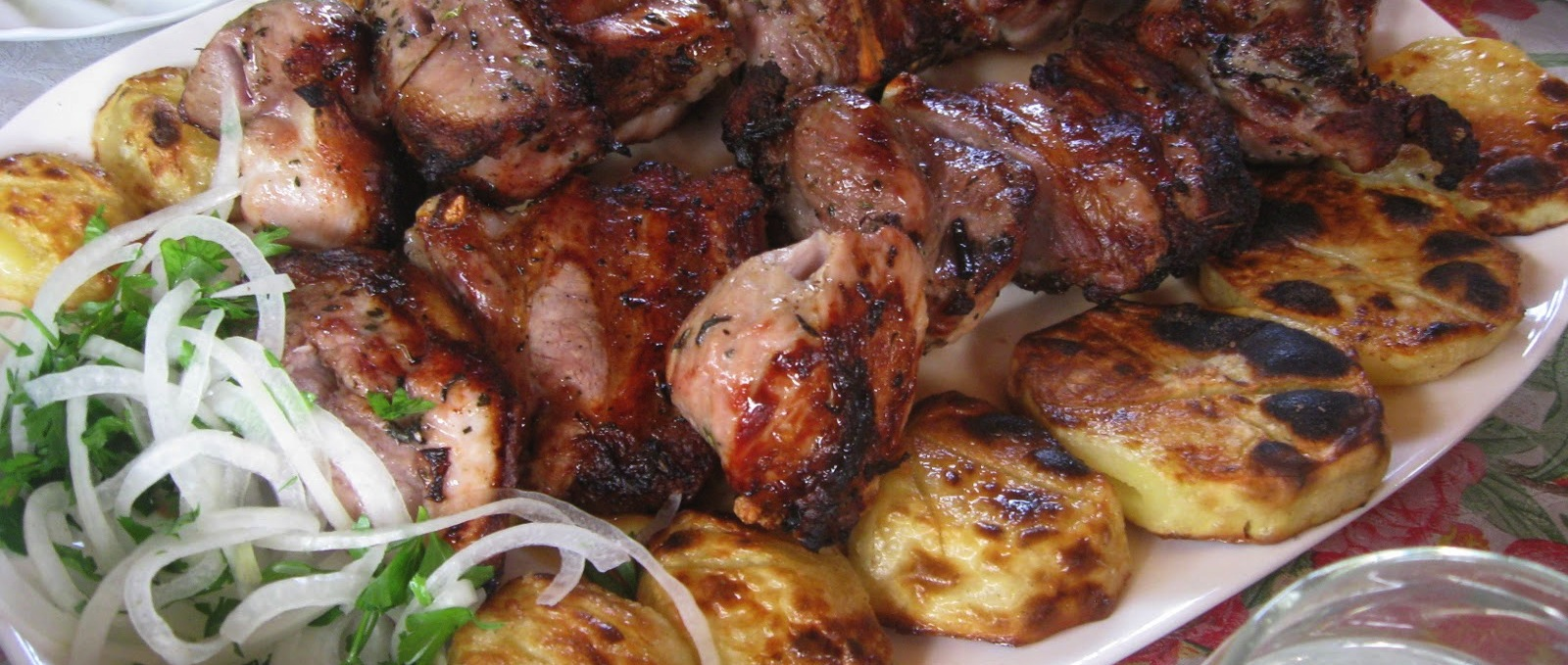
Armenian khorovats

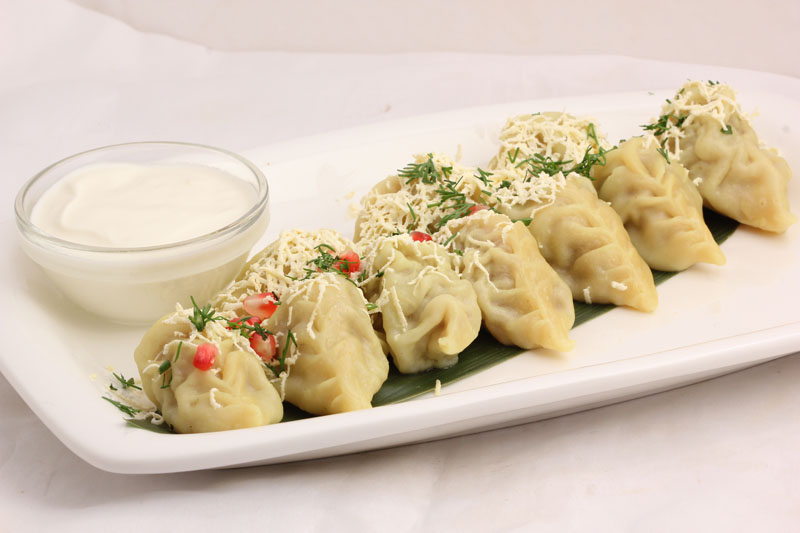
Azerbaijani Gürzə

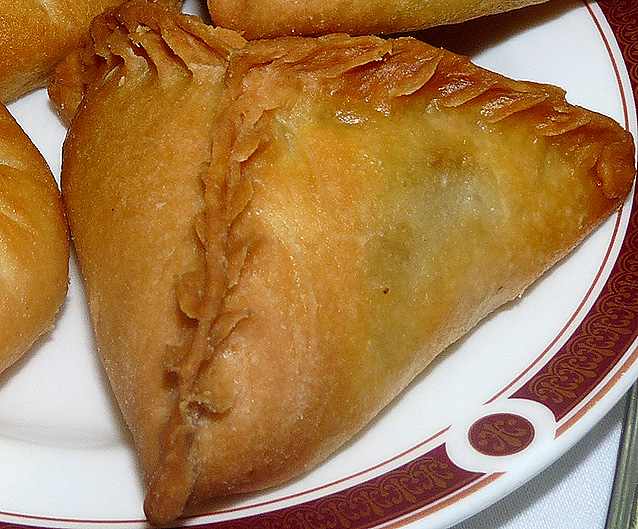
Bashkir and Tatar Öçpoçmaq

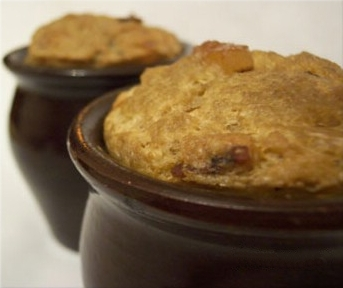
Belarusian potato babka

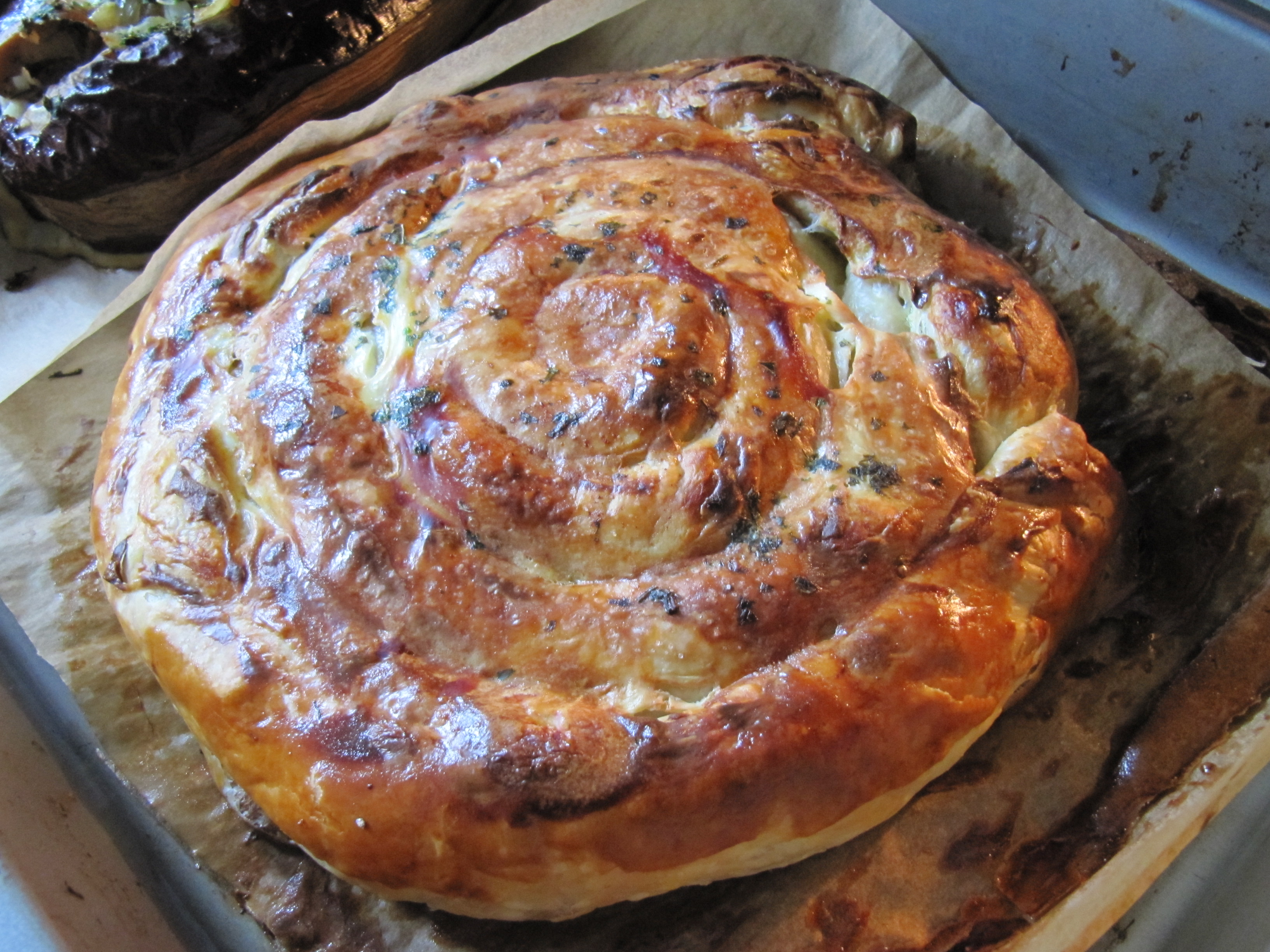
Bulgarian banitsa

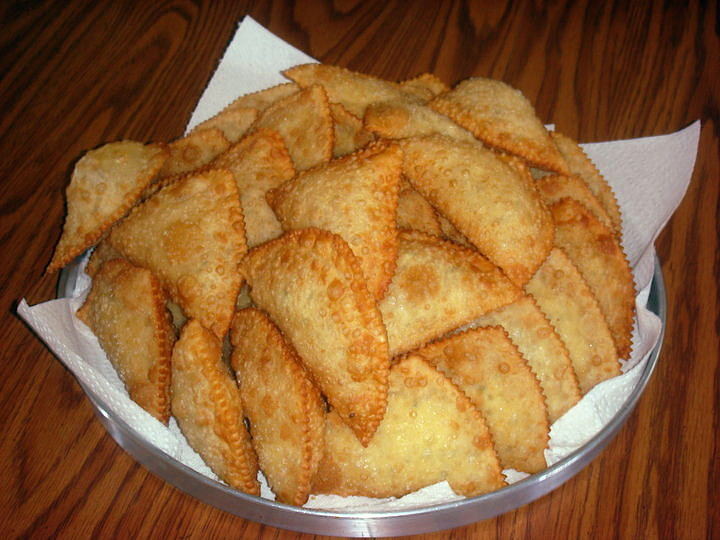
Circassian Haliva

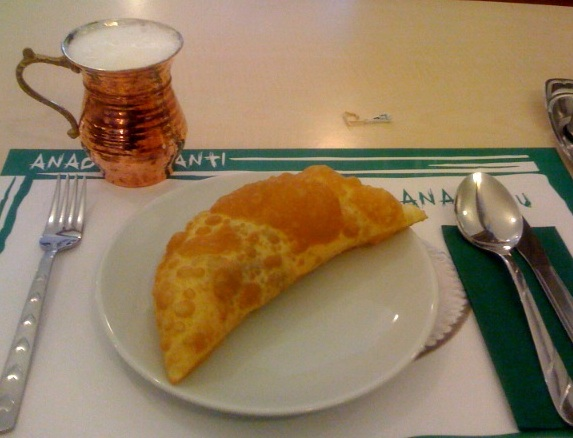
Crimean Tatar chiburekki

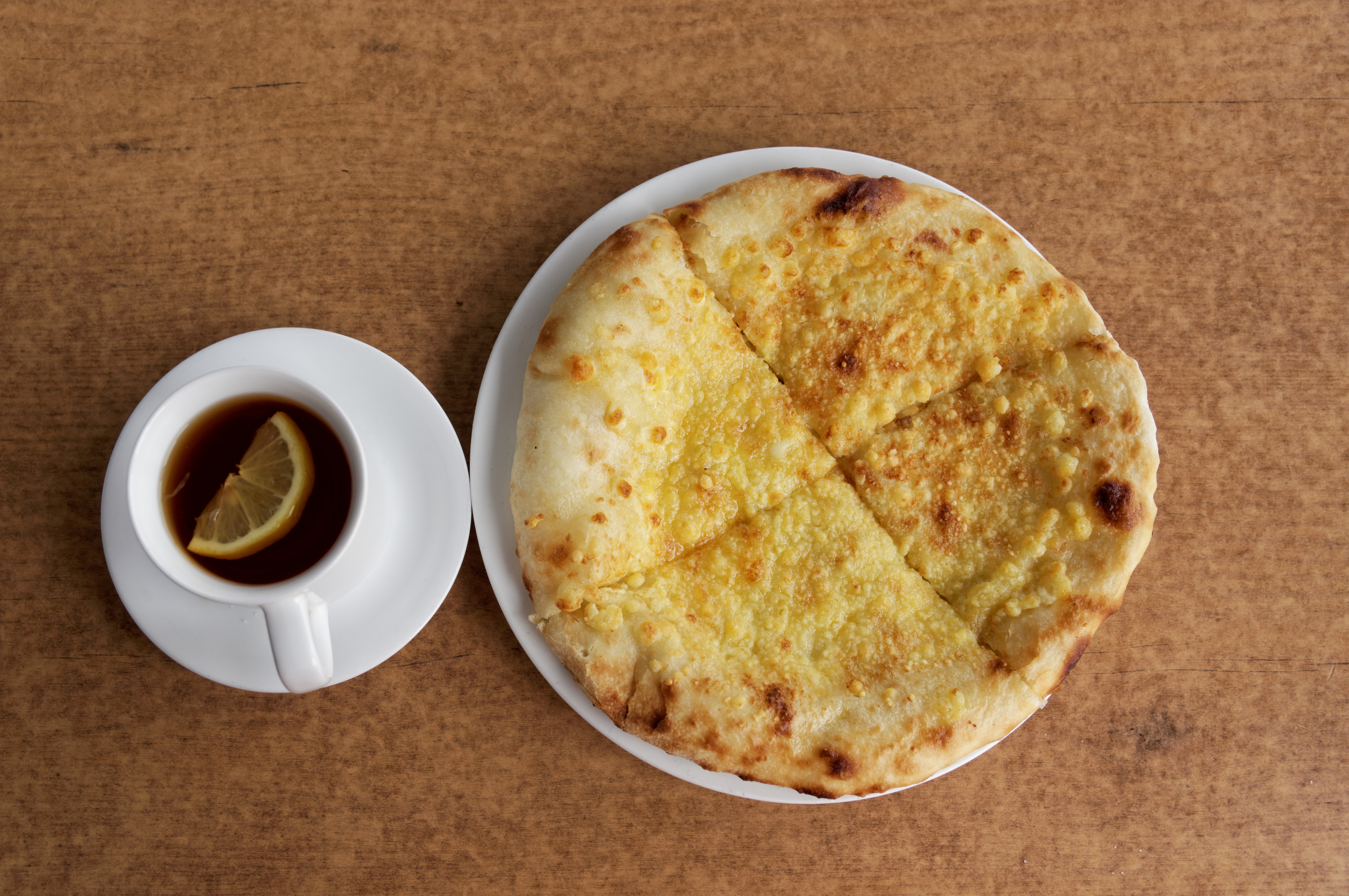
Georgian khachapuri

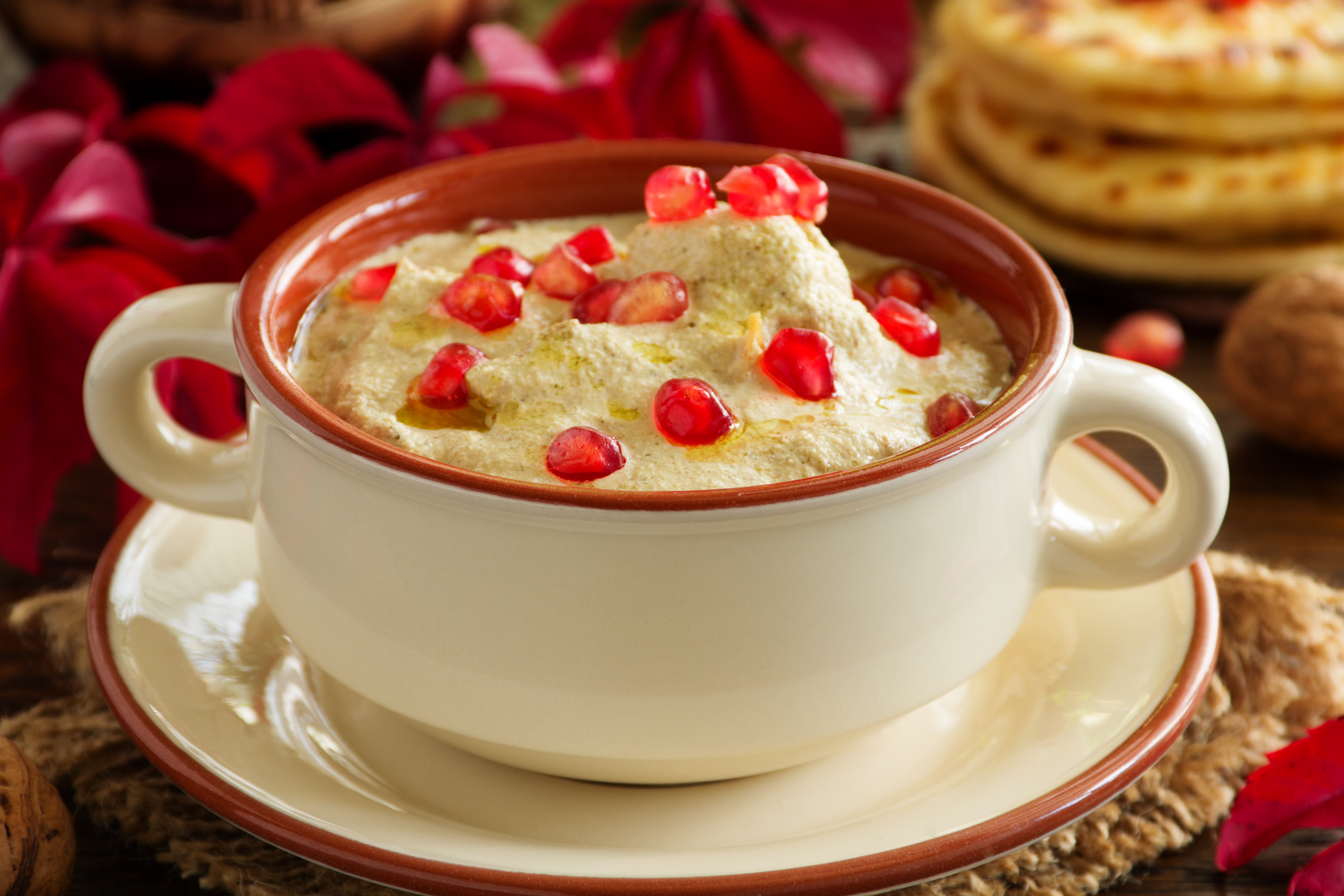
Georgian satsivi

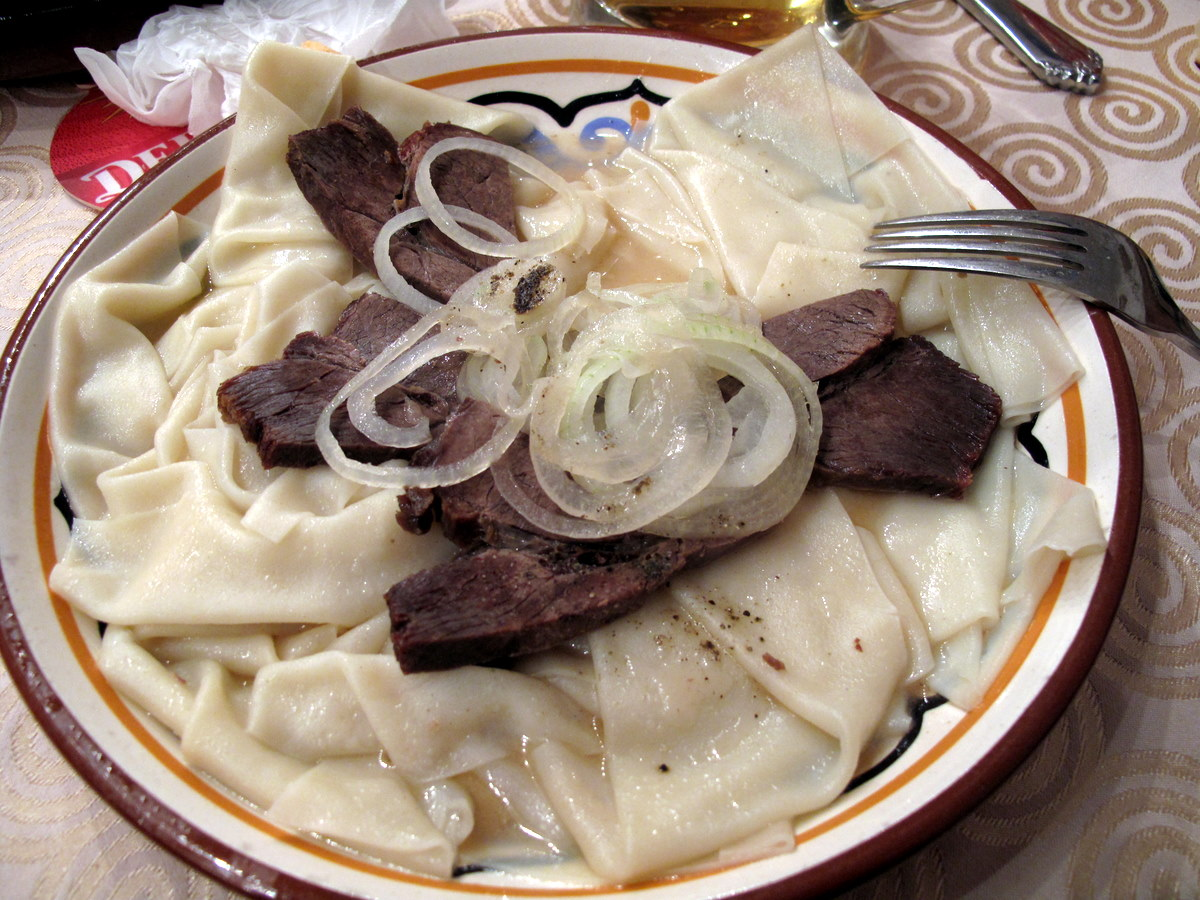
Kazakh beshbarmak

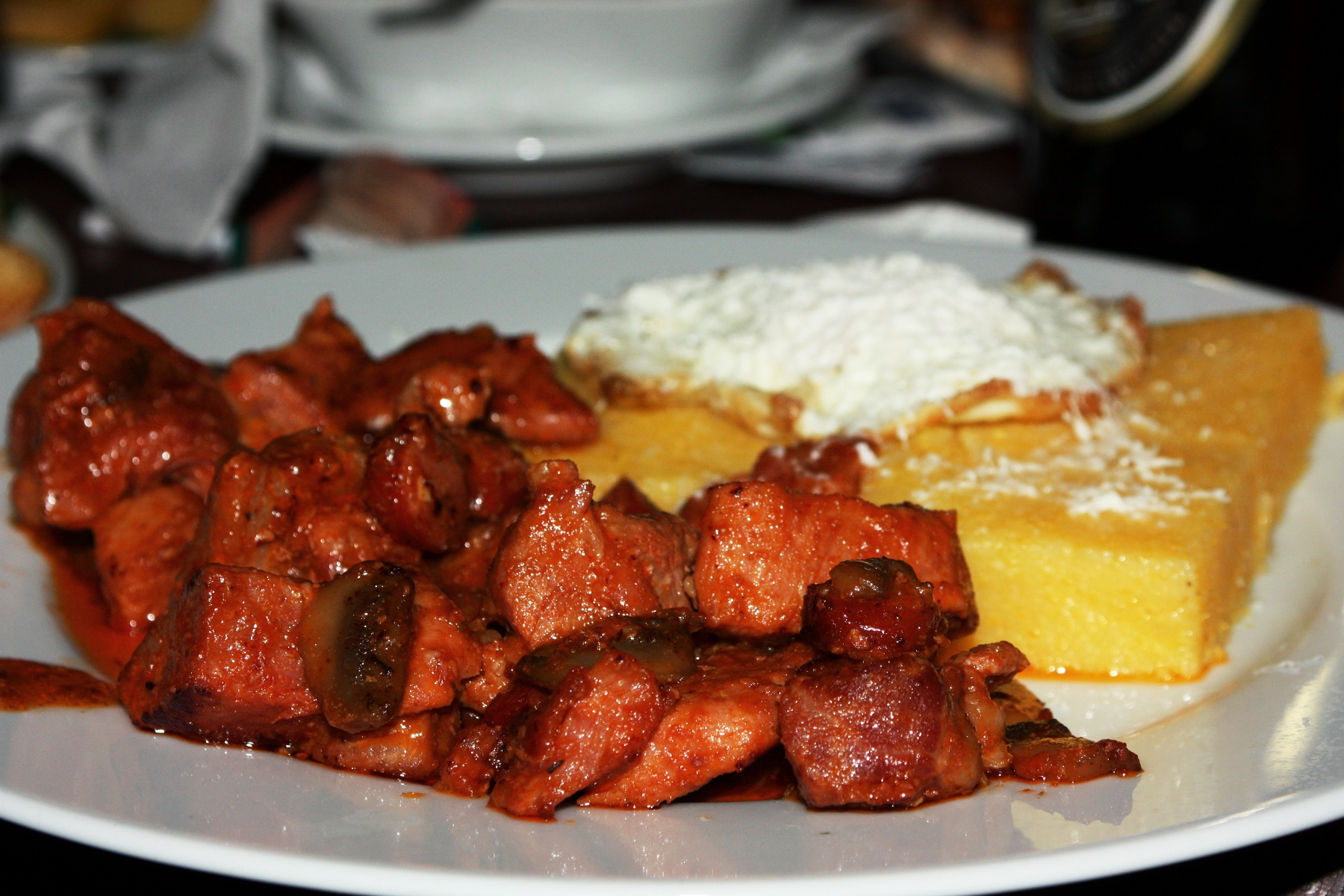
Moldovan Tochitură

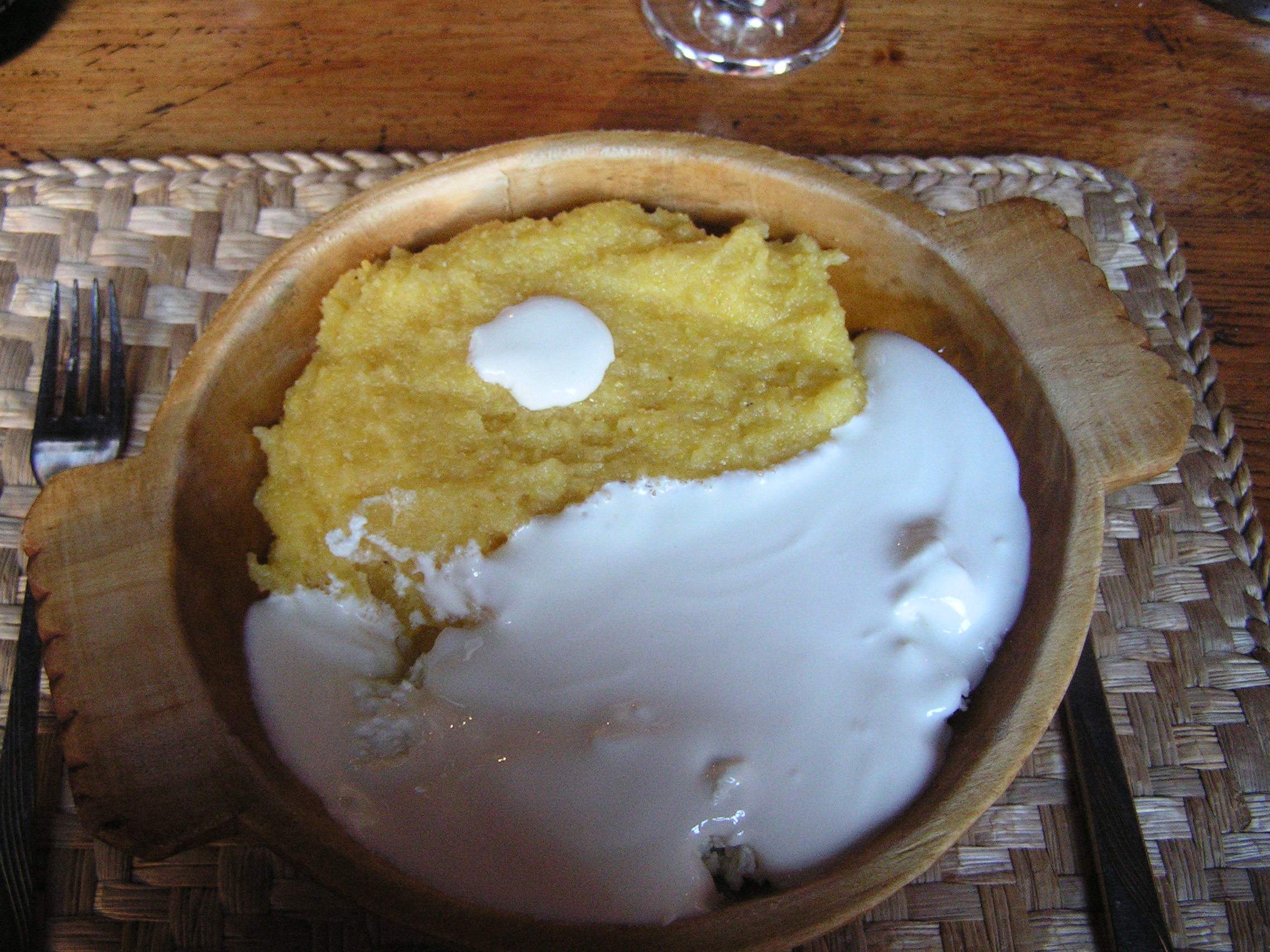
Romanian mămăligă

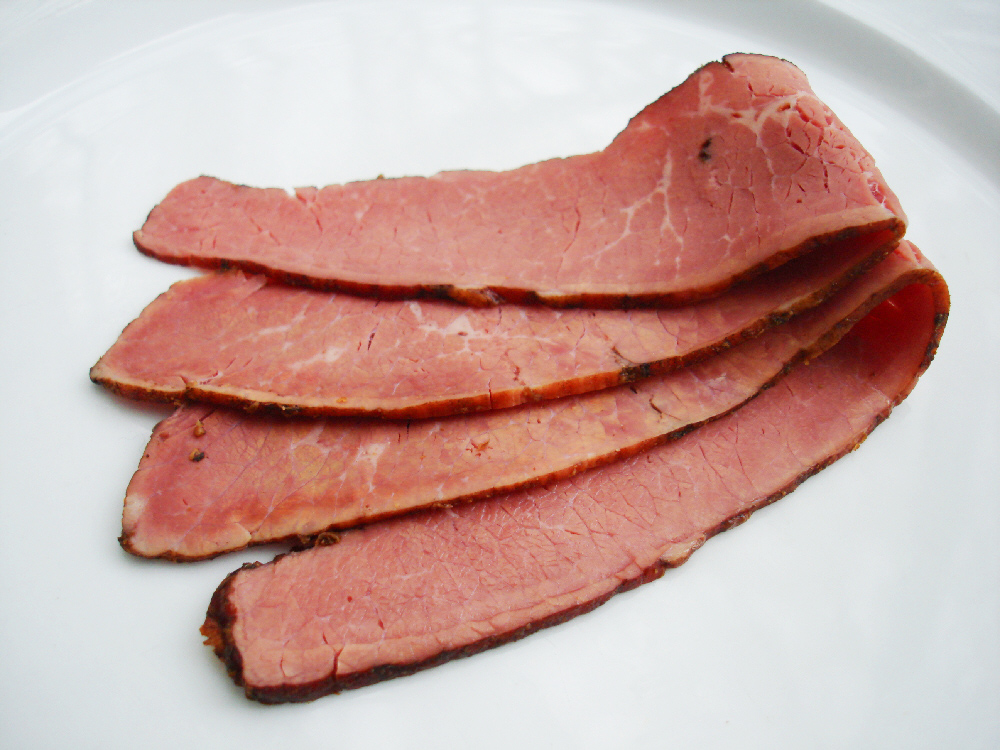
Romanian pastrami

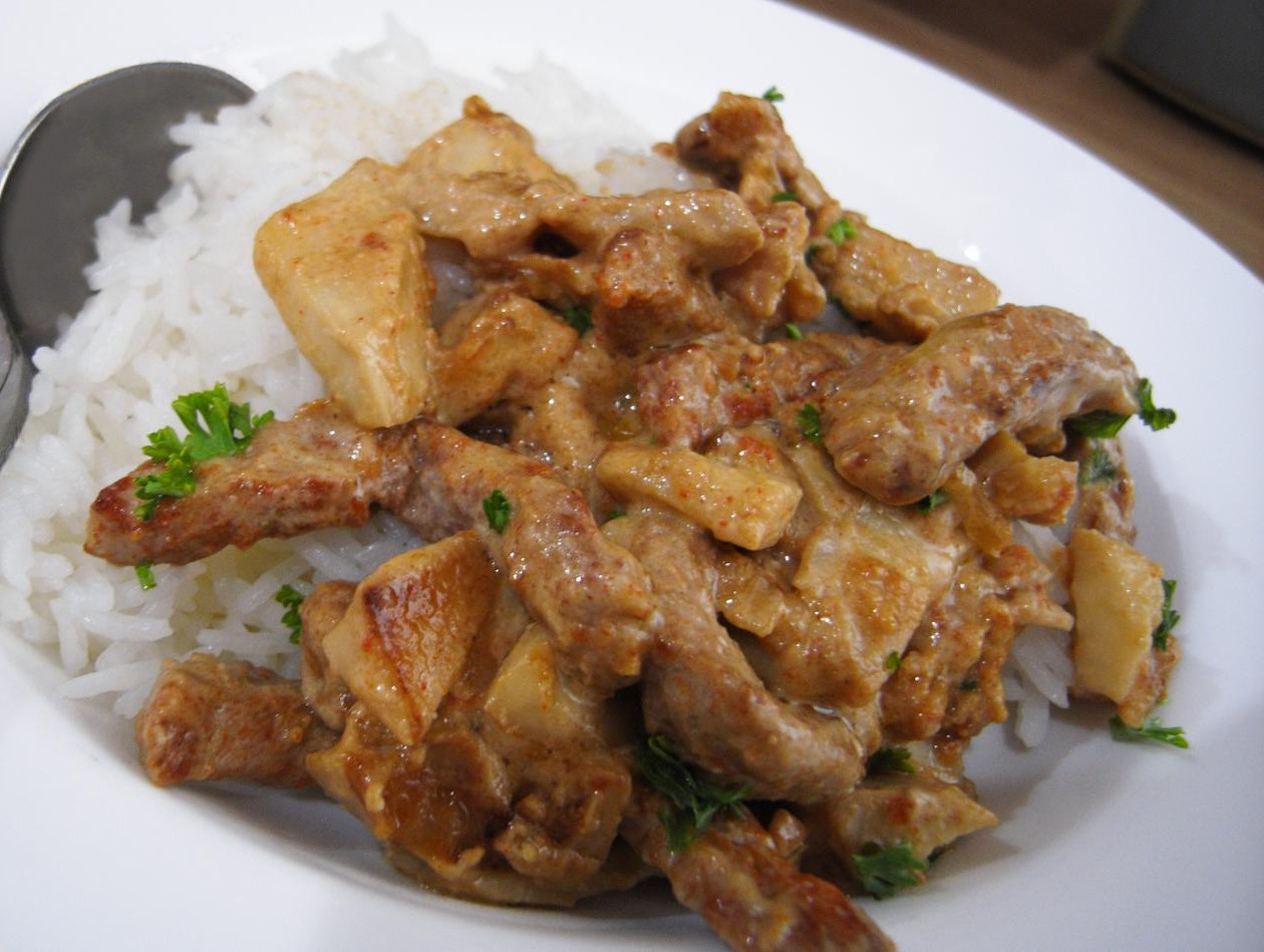
Russian beef Stroganoff

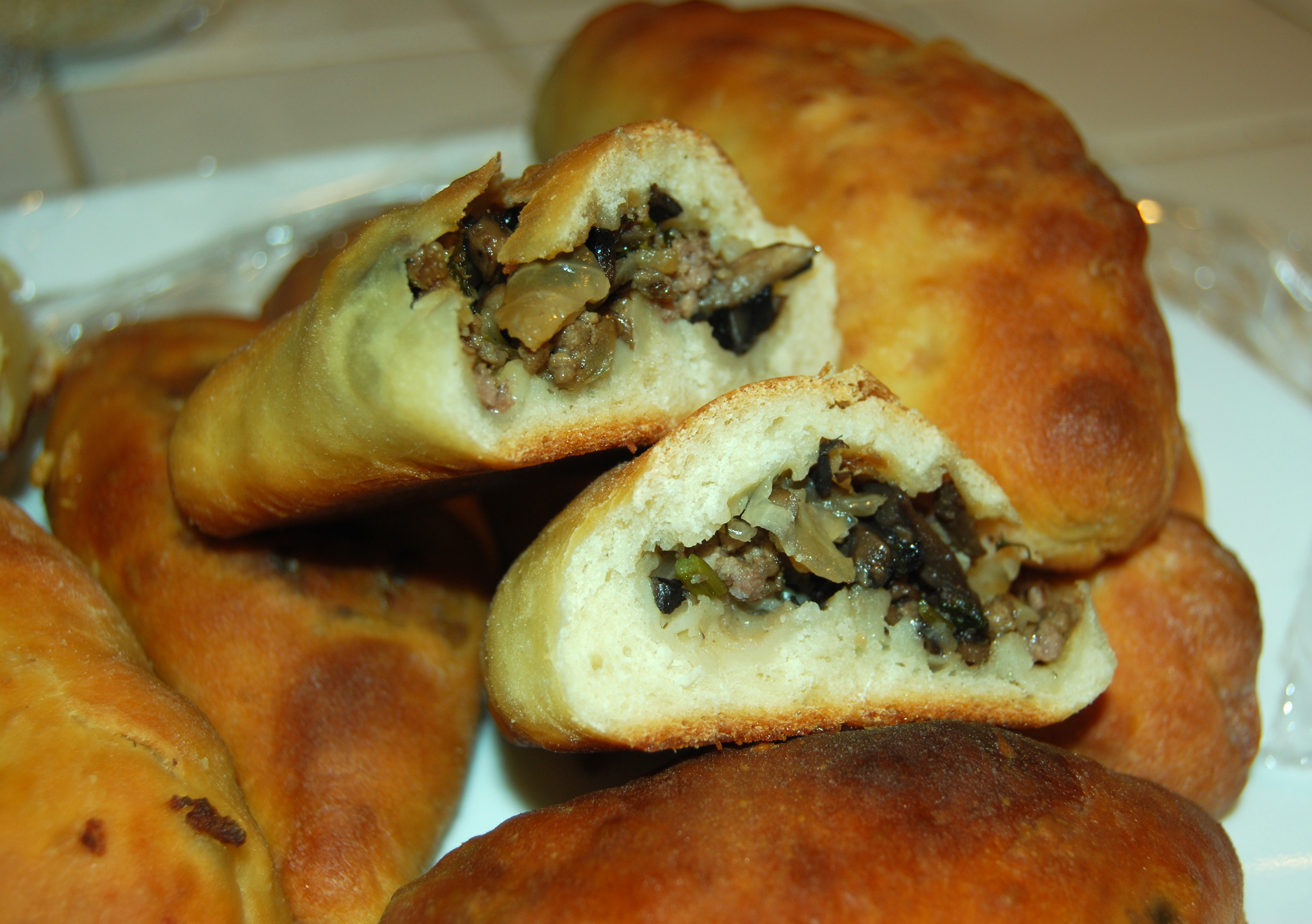
Russian pirozhki

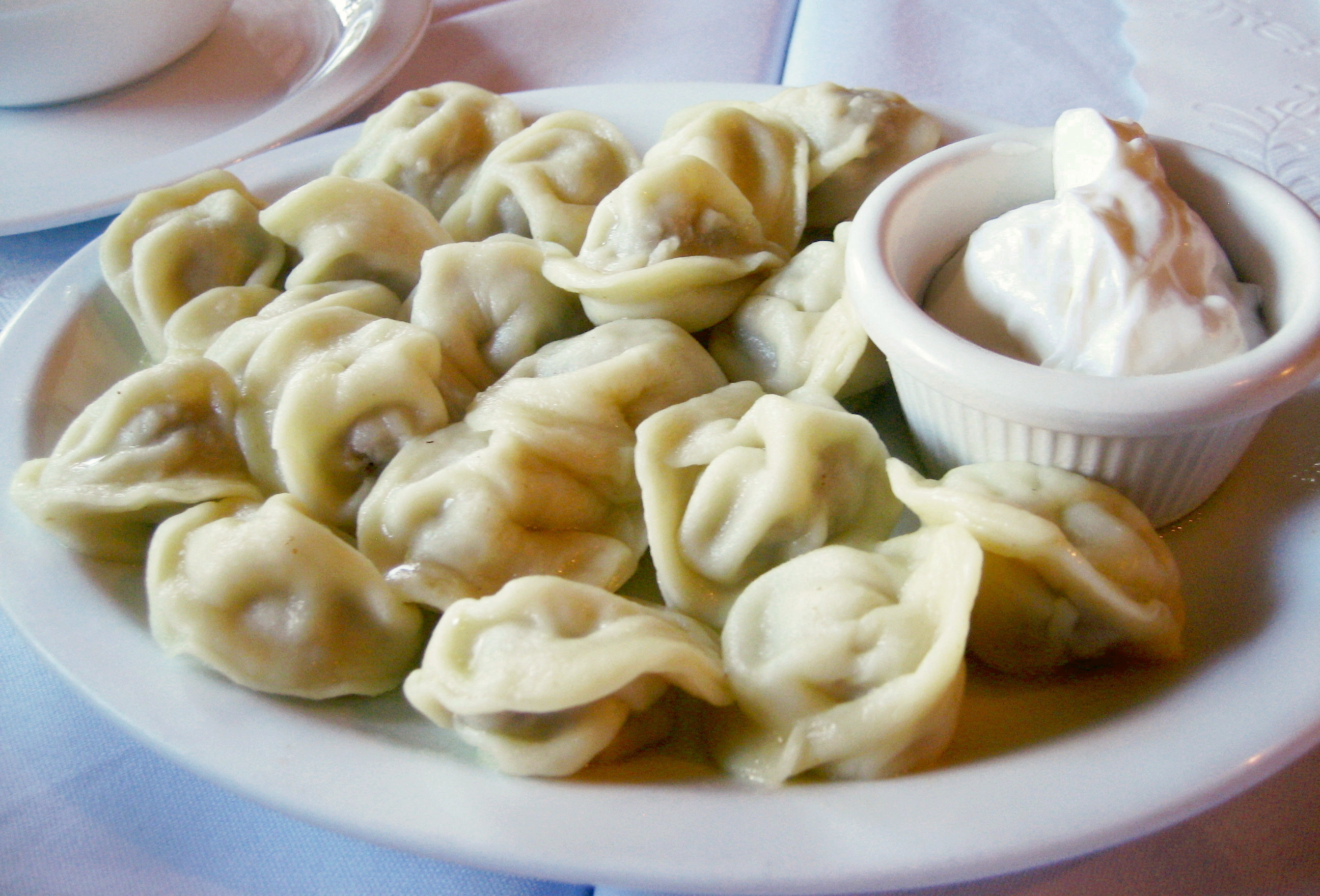
Russian pelmeni

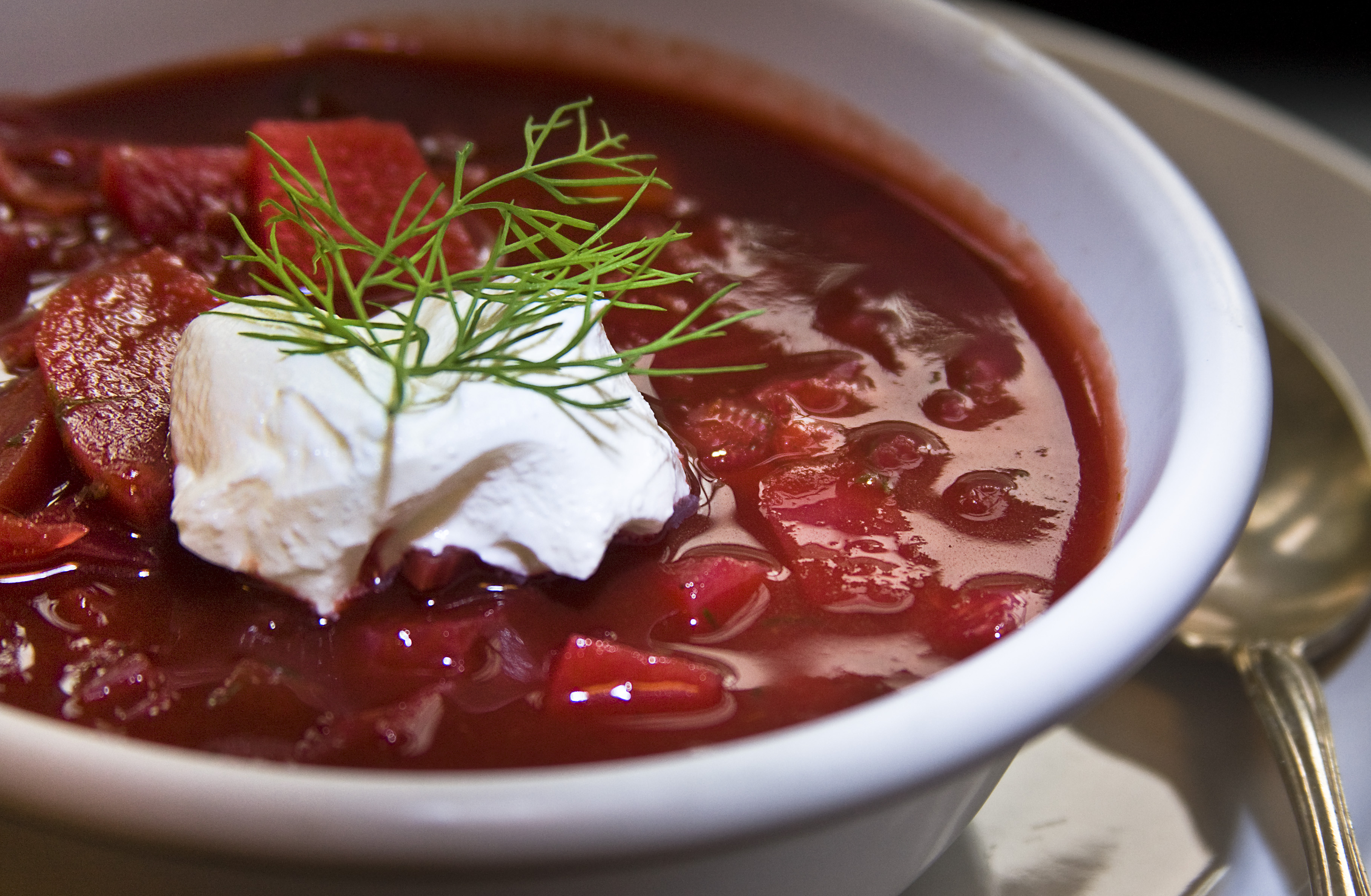
Ukrainian borscht

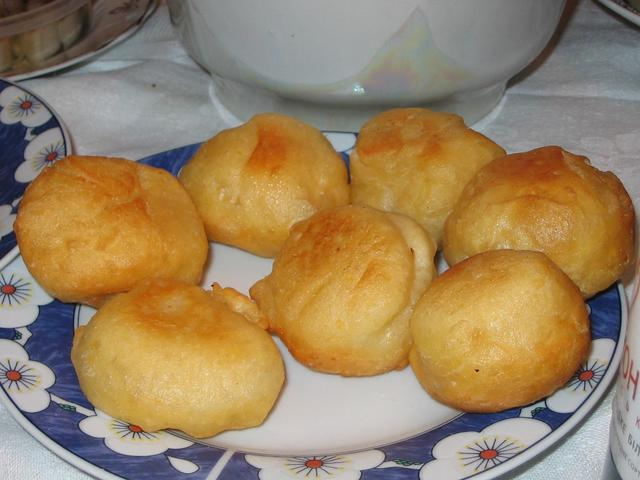
Ukrainian pampushka

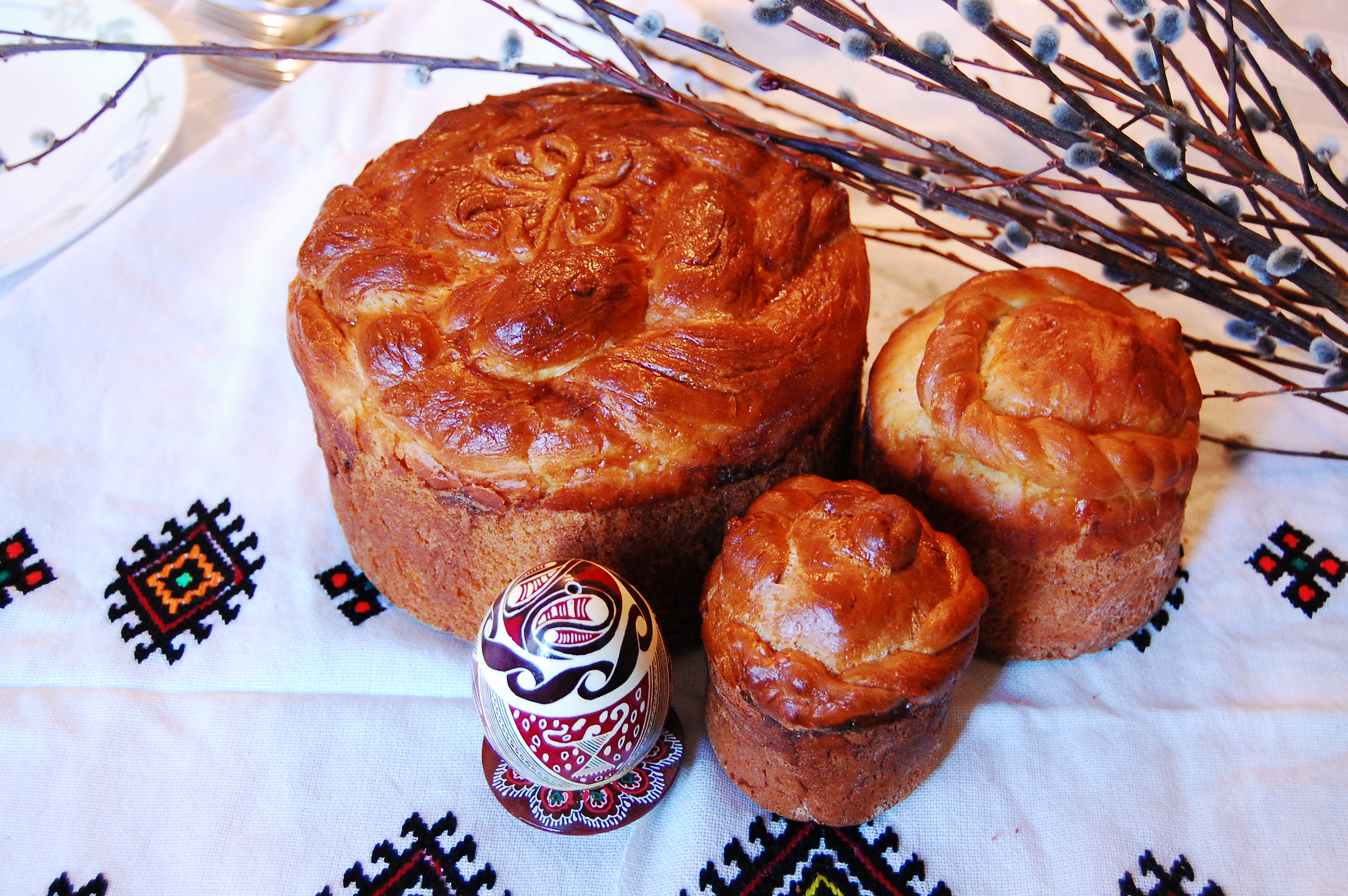
Ukrainian paska

== Northern European cuisines ==
- (United Kingdom) British cuisine
  - (Guernsey) (Jersey) Channel Islands cuisine
  - (England) English cuisine
    - (Cornwall) Cornish cuisine
    - (Devon) Devonian cuisine
    - Dorset cuisine
    - Victorian cuisine
  - Northern Irish cuisine
  - (Scotland) Scottish cuisine
  - (Wales) Welsh cuisine
    - Cuisine of Carmarthenshire
    - Cuisine of Ceredigion
    - Cuisine of Gower
    - Cuisine of Monmouthshire
    - Cuisine of Pembrokeshire
    - Cuisine of the Vale of Glamorgan
- (Denmark) Danish cuisine
  - (Faroe Islands) Faroese cuisine
  - New Nordic Cuisine
- (Estonia) Estonian cuisine
- (Finland) Finnish cuisine
- (Iceland) Icelandic cuisine
- (Republic of Ireland) Irish cuisine
- (Latvia) Latvian cuisine
- (Lithuania) Lithuanian cuisine
- Livonian cuisine
- (Norway) Norwegian cuisine
- (Sápmi) Sami cuisine
- (Sweden) Swedish cuisine
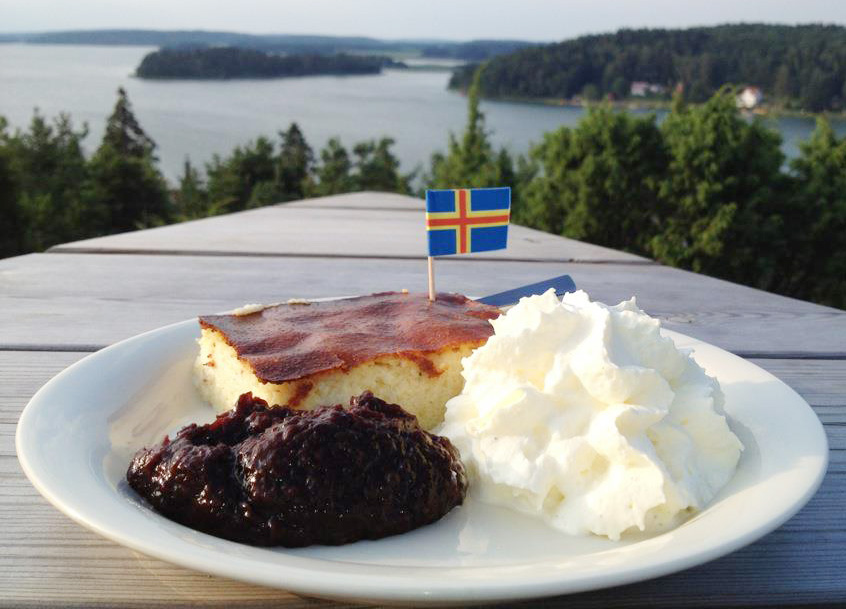
Åland pancake

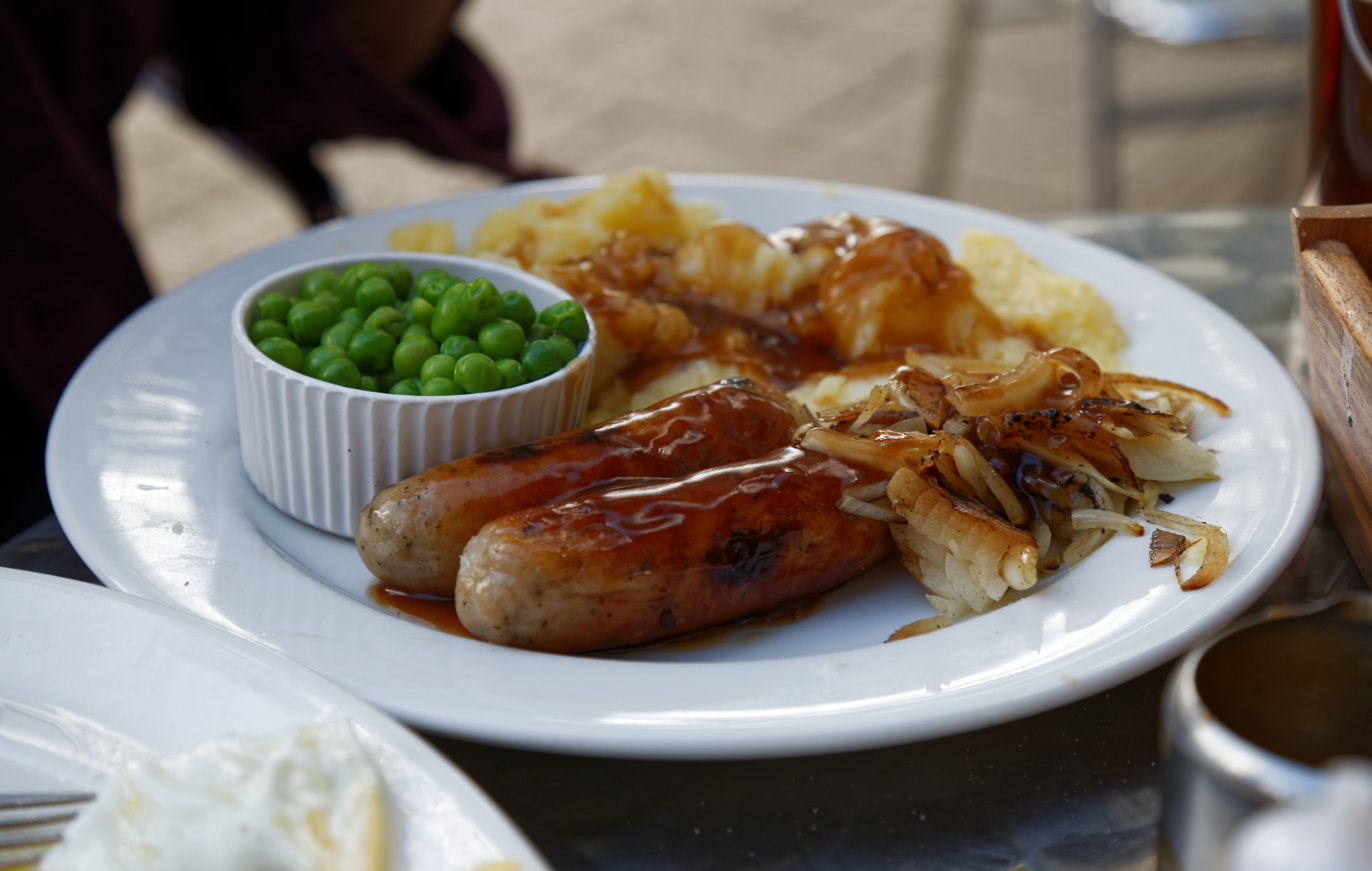
British bangers and mash

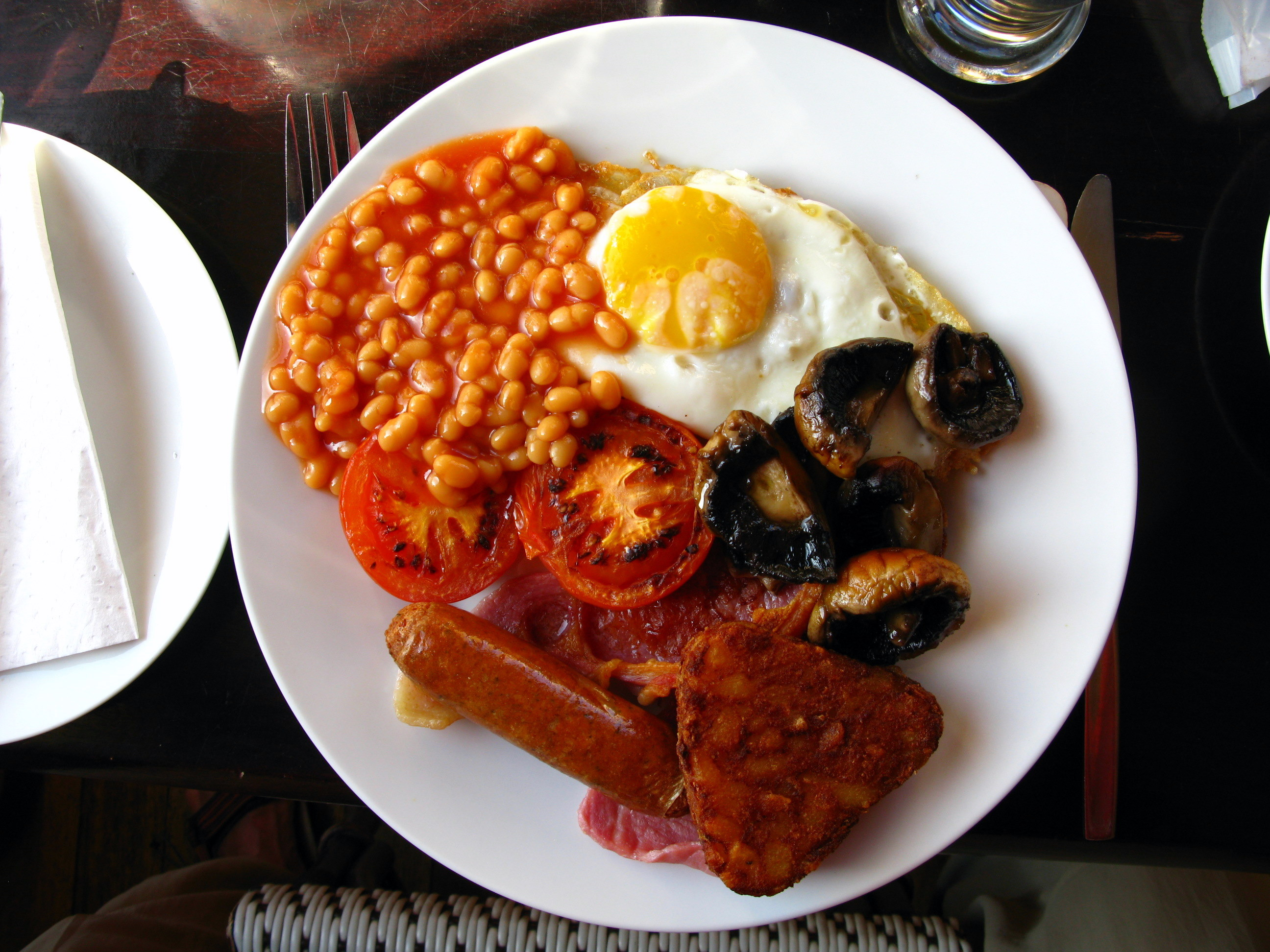
British full breakfast

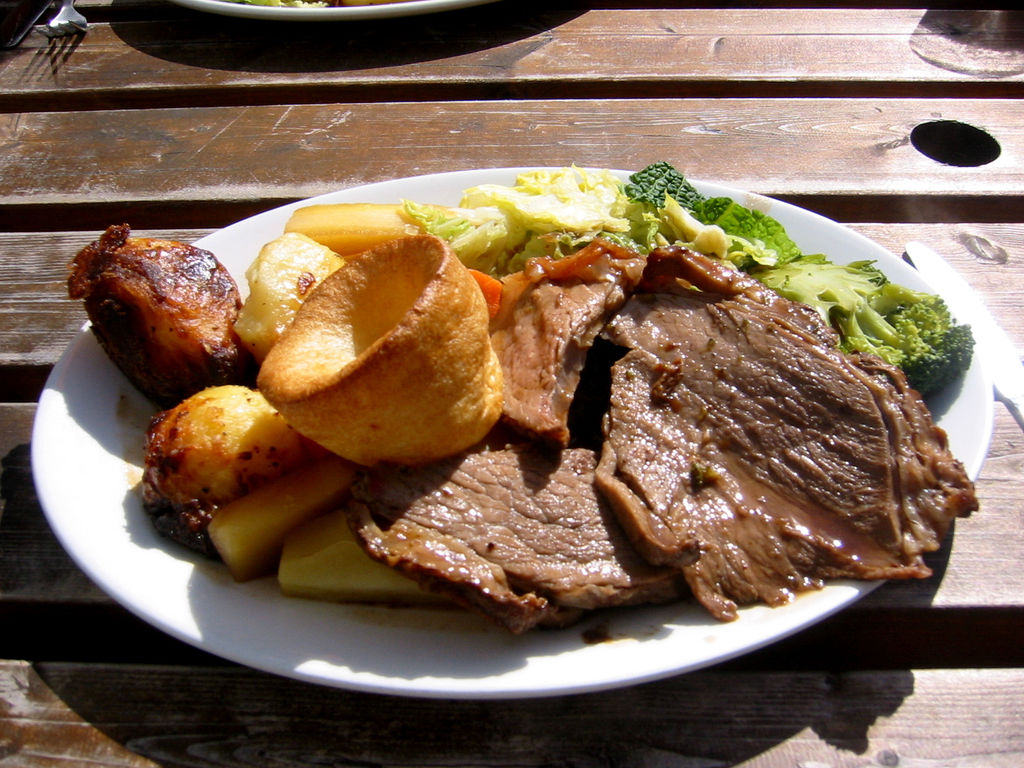
British Sunday roast

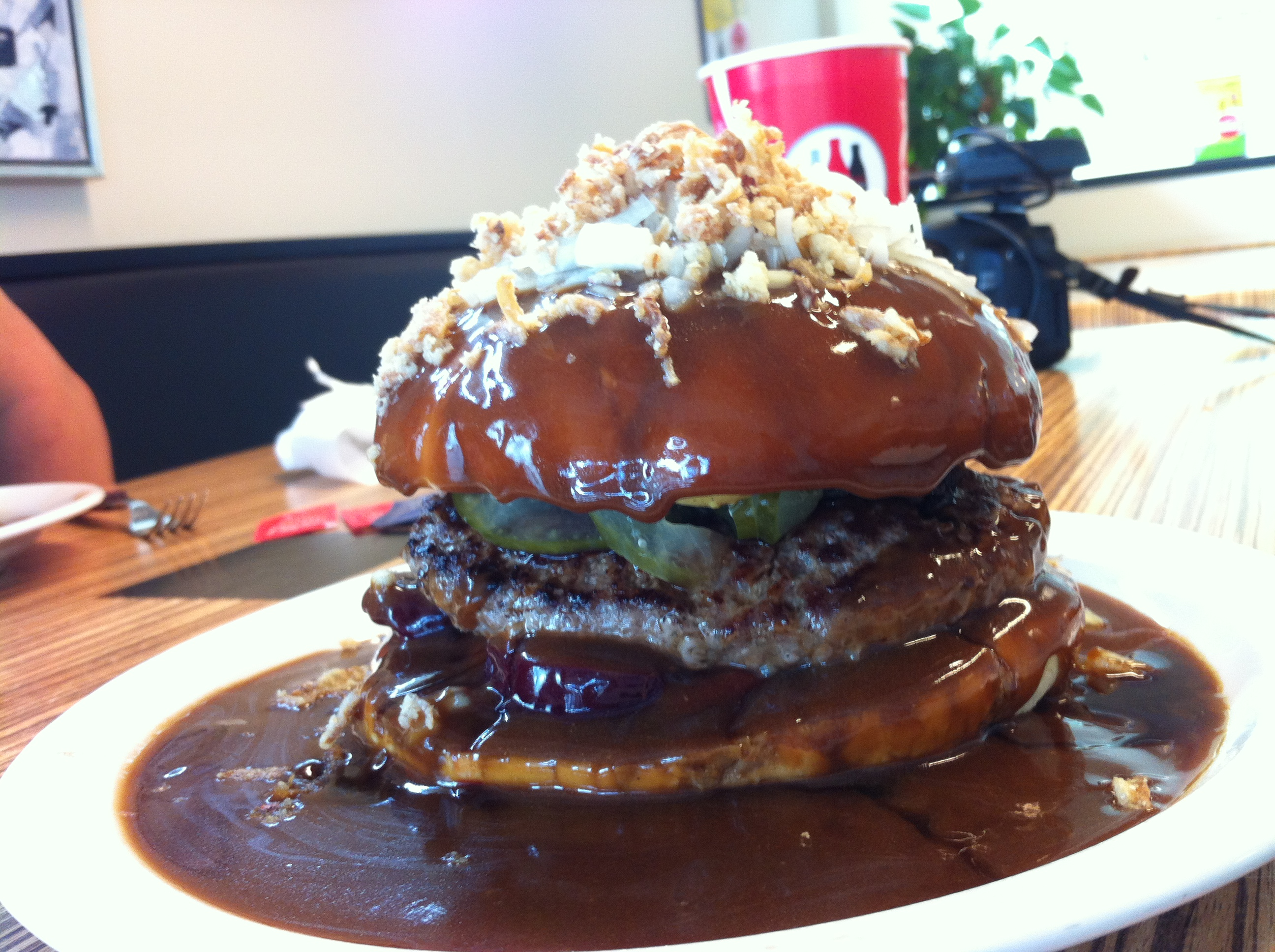
Danish bøfsandwich

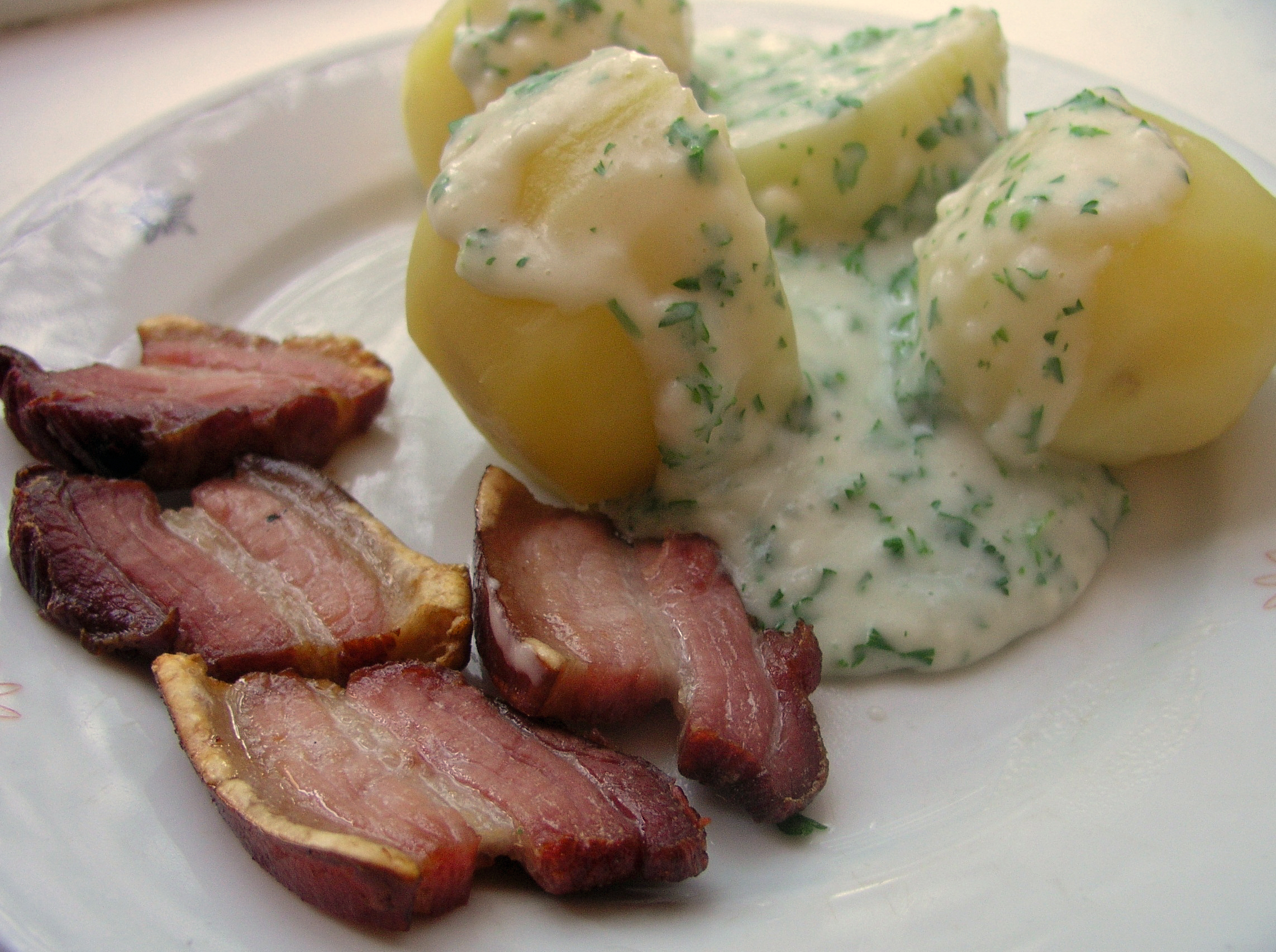
Danish Stegt flæsk

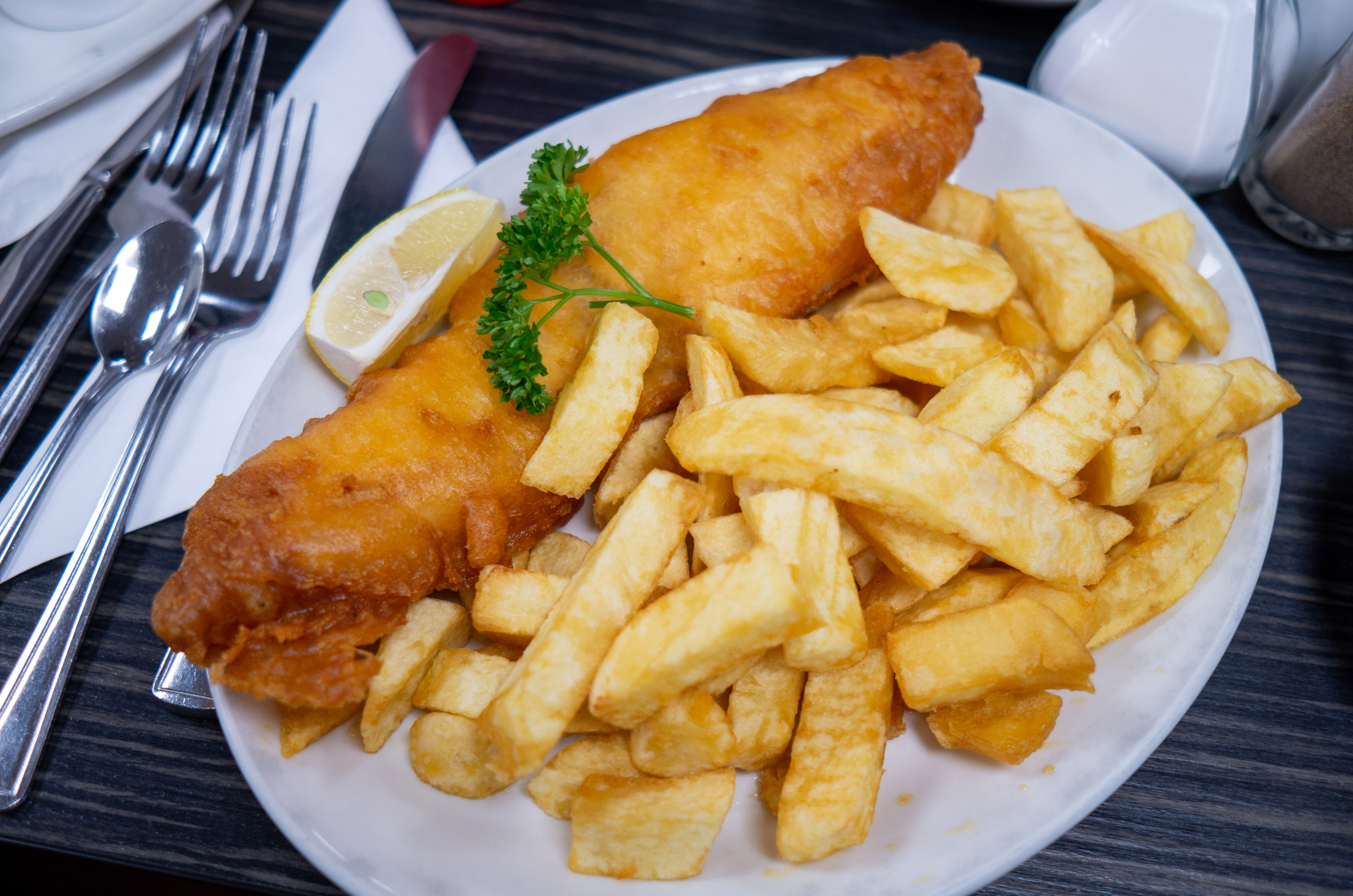
English fish and chips

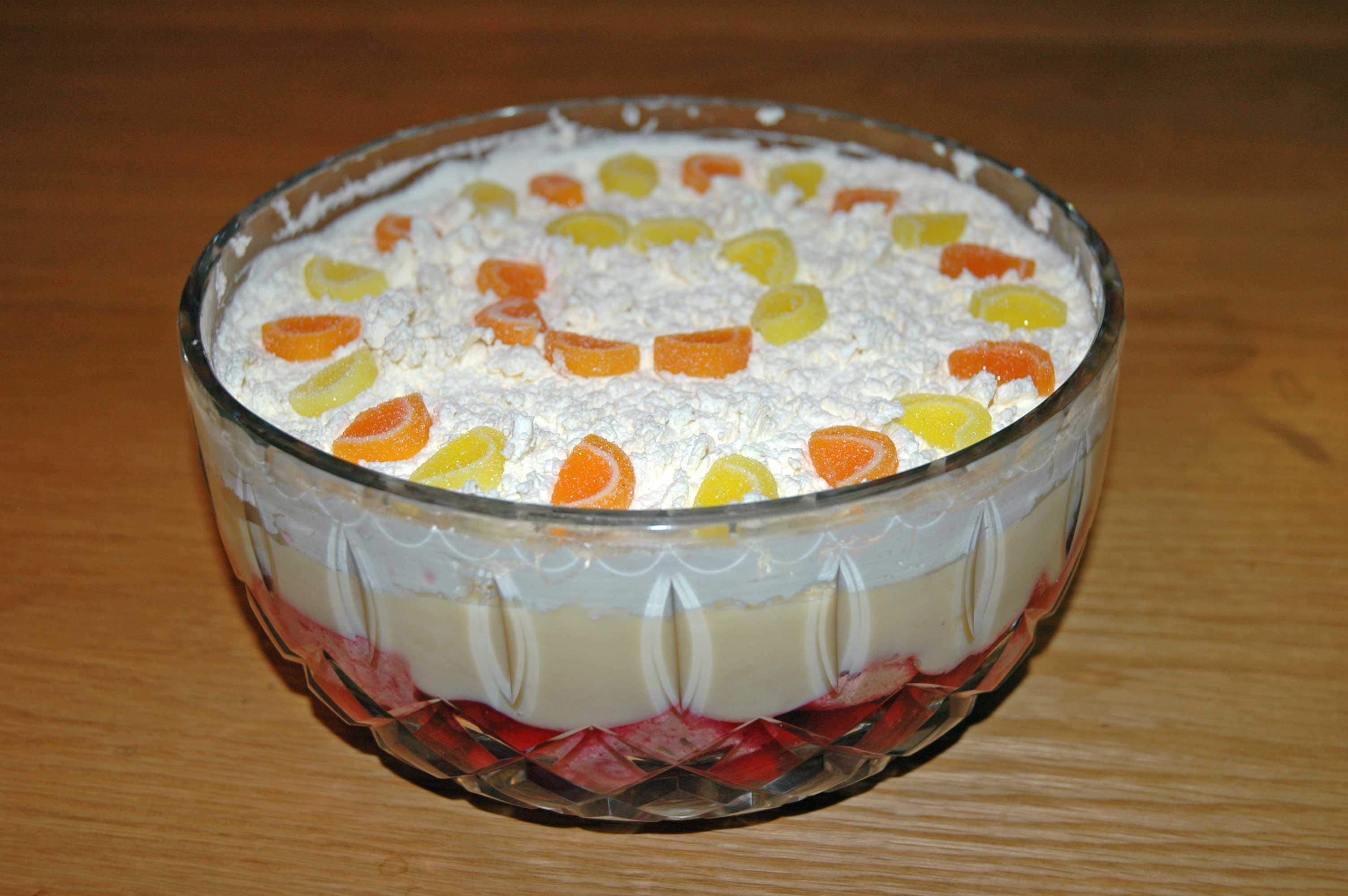
English trifle

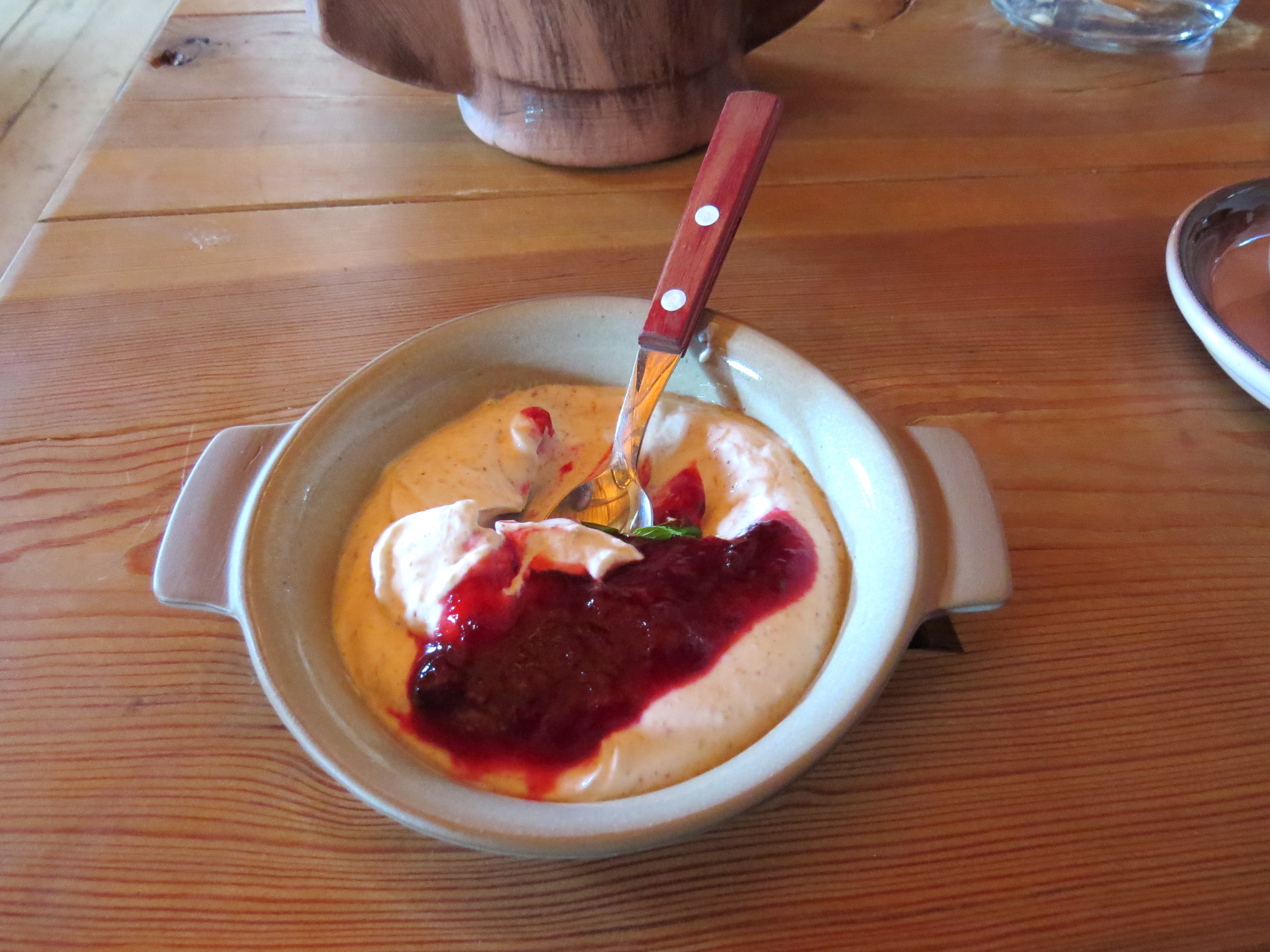
Estonian kama dessert

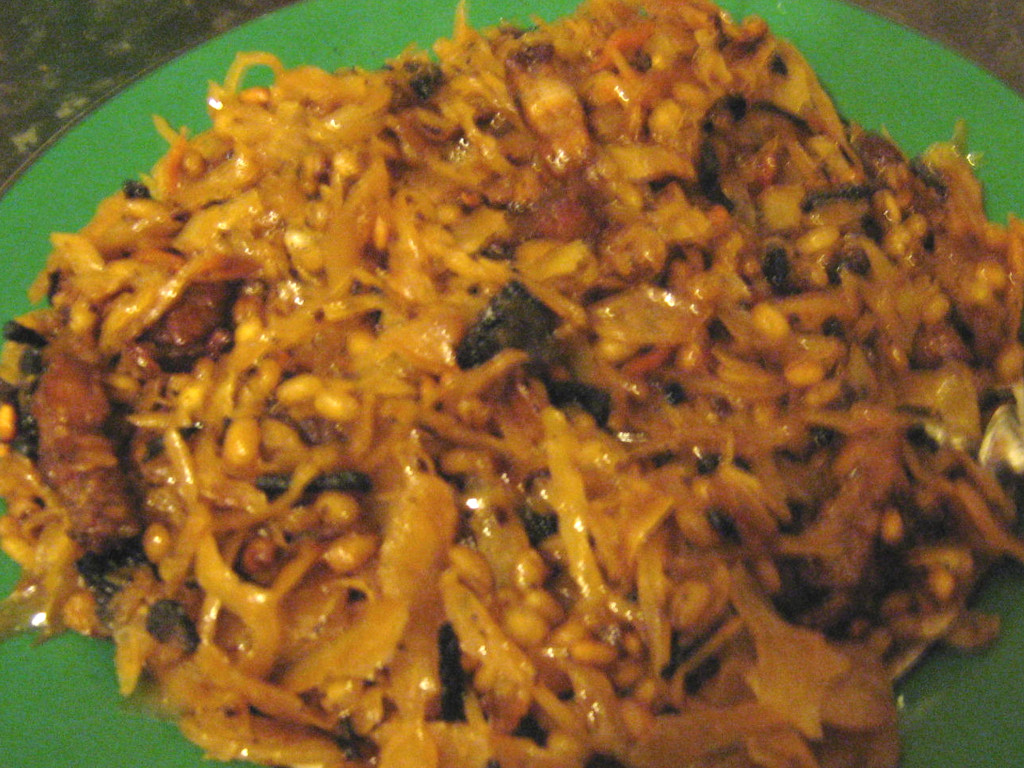
Estonian Mulgikapsad

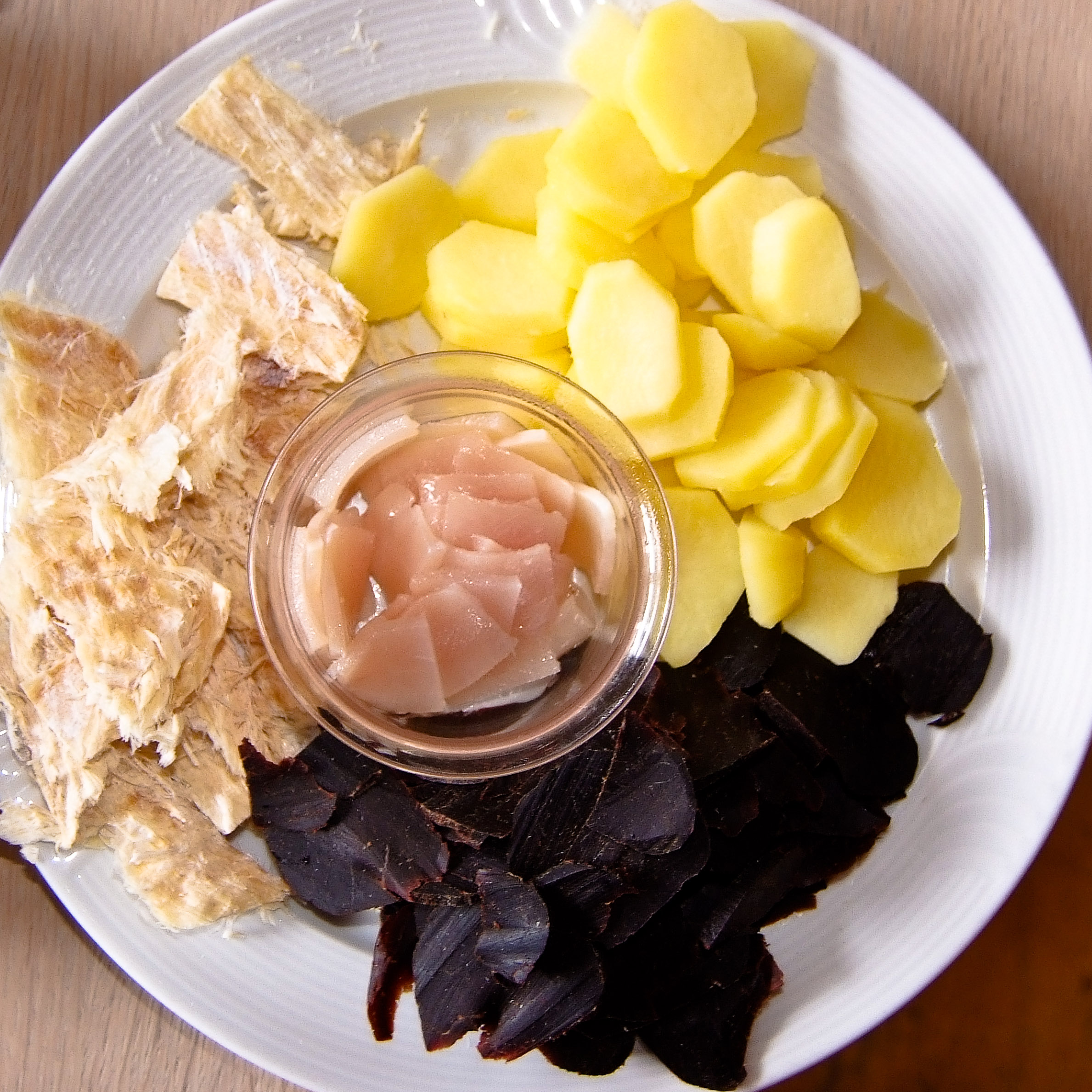
Faroese tvøst og spik

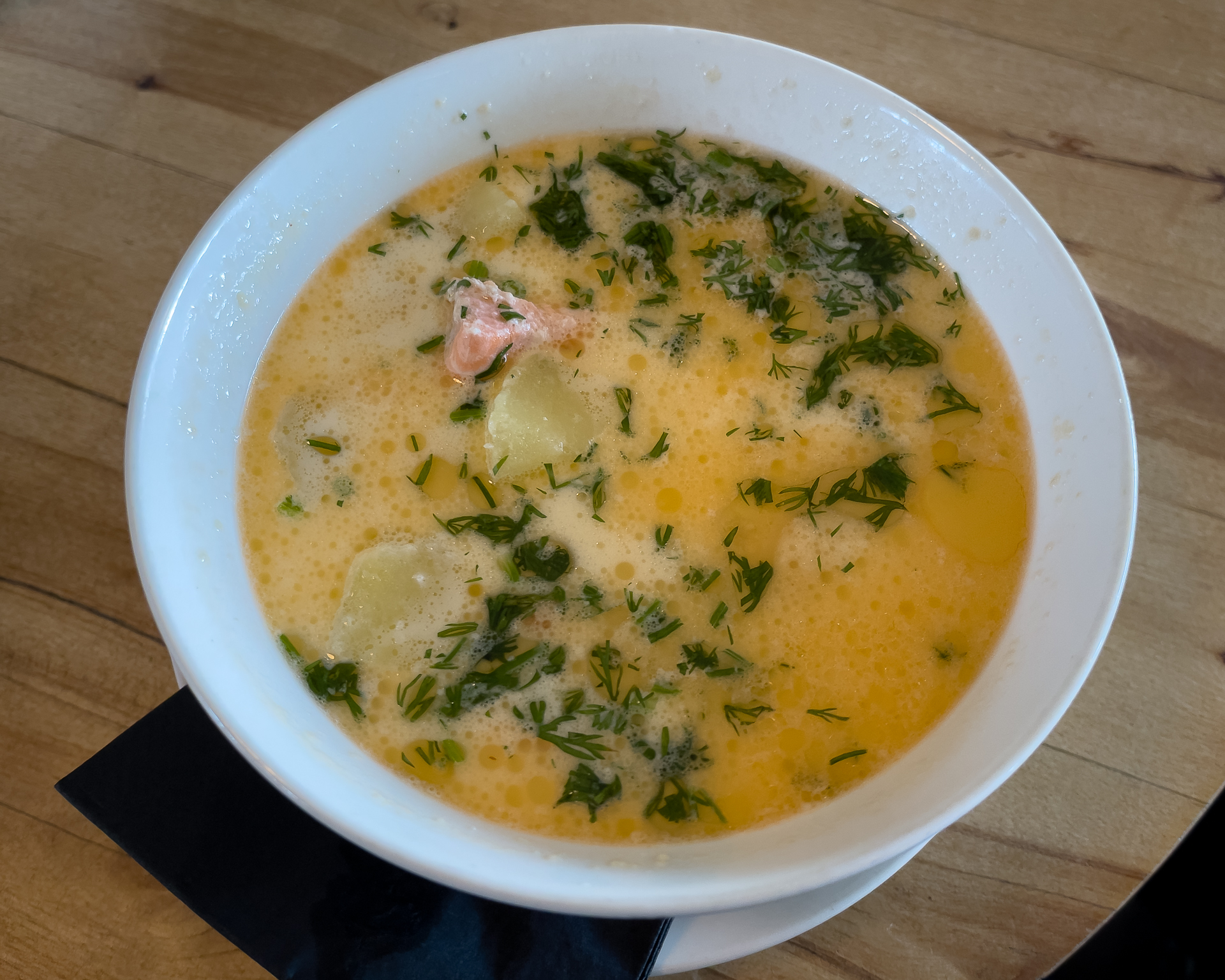
Finnish Lohikeitto

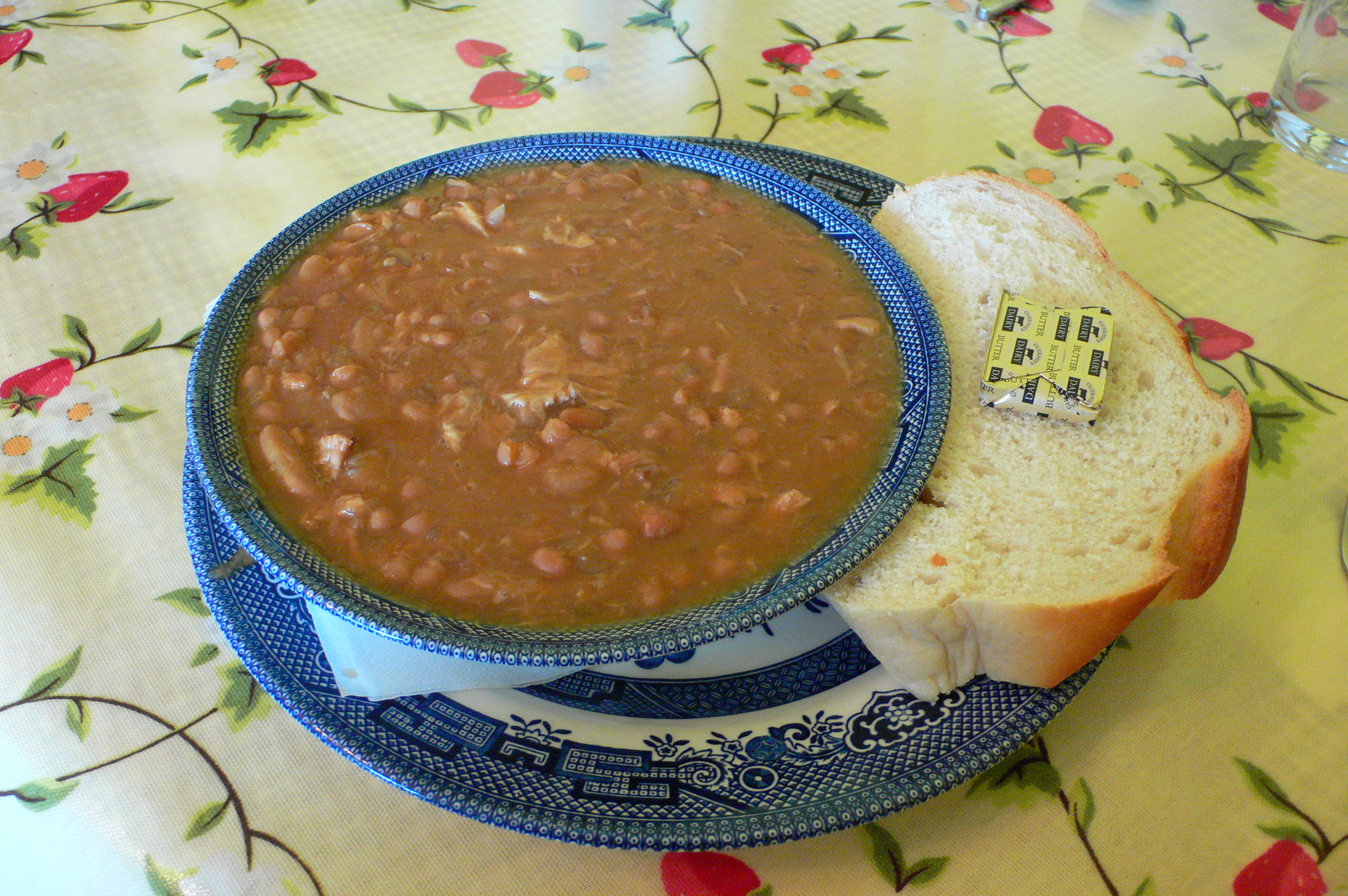
Guernsey Bean Jar

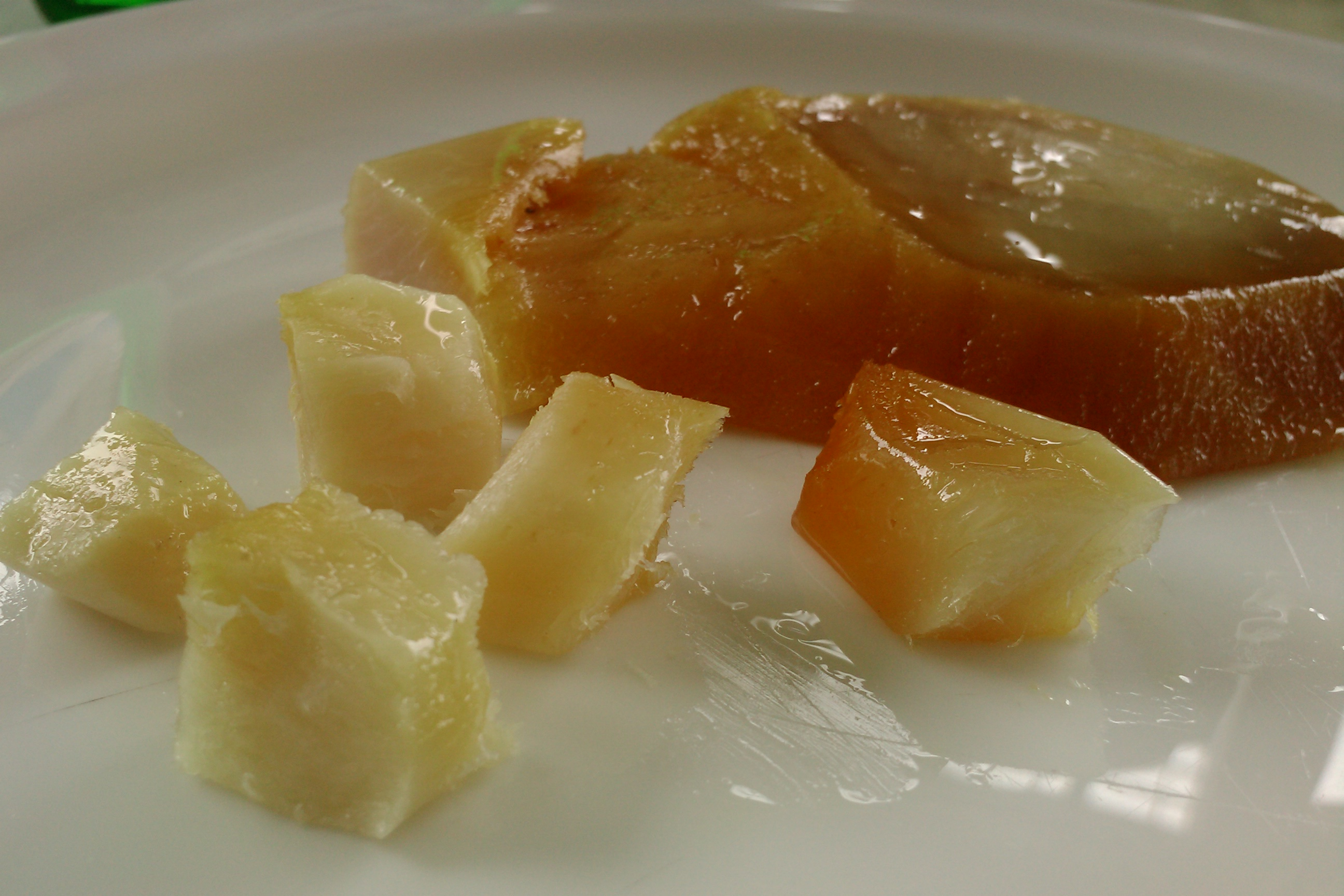
Icelandic hákarl

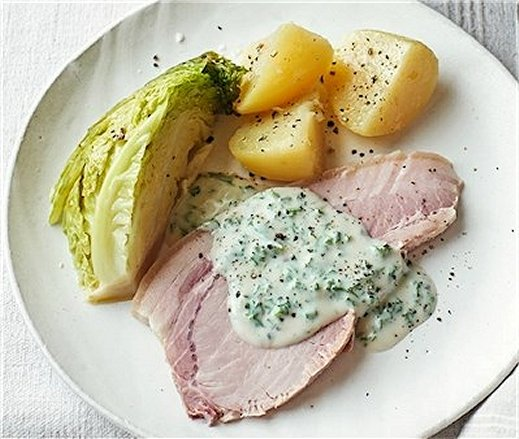
Irish bacon and cabbage

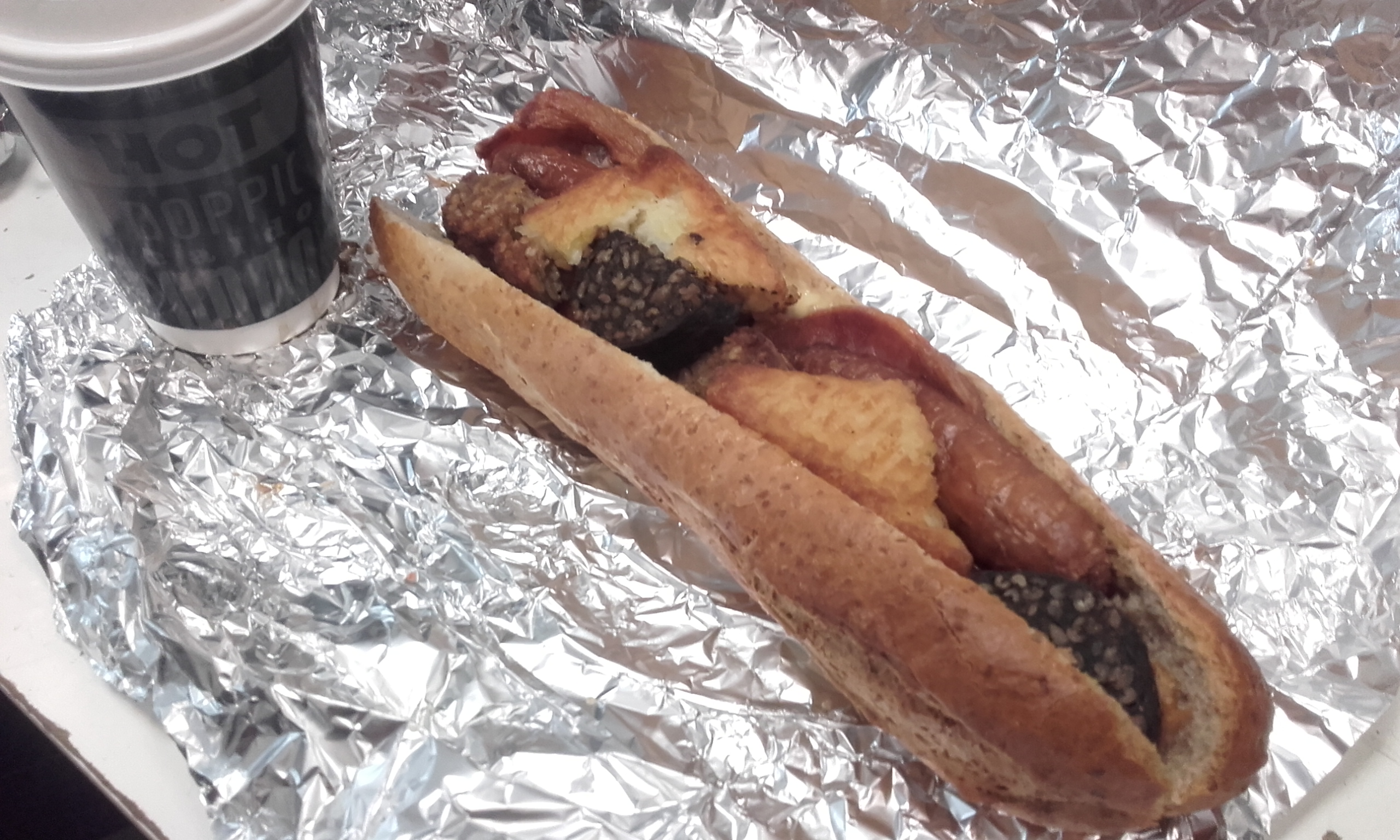
Irish breakfast roll

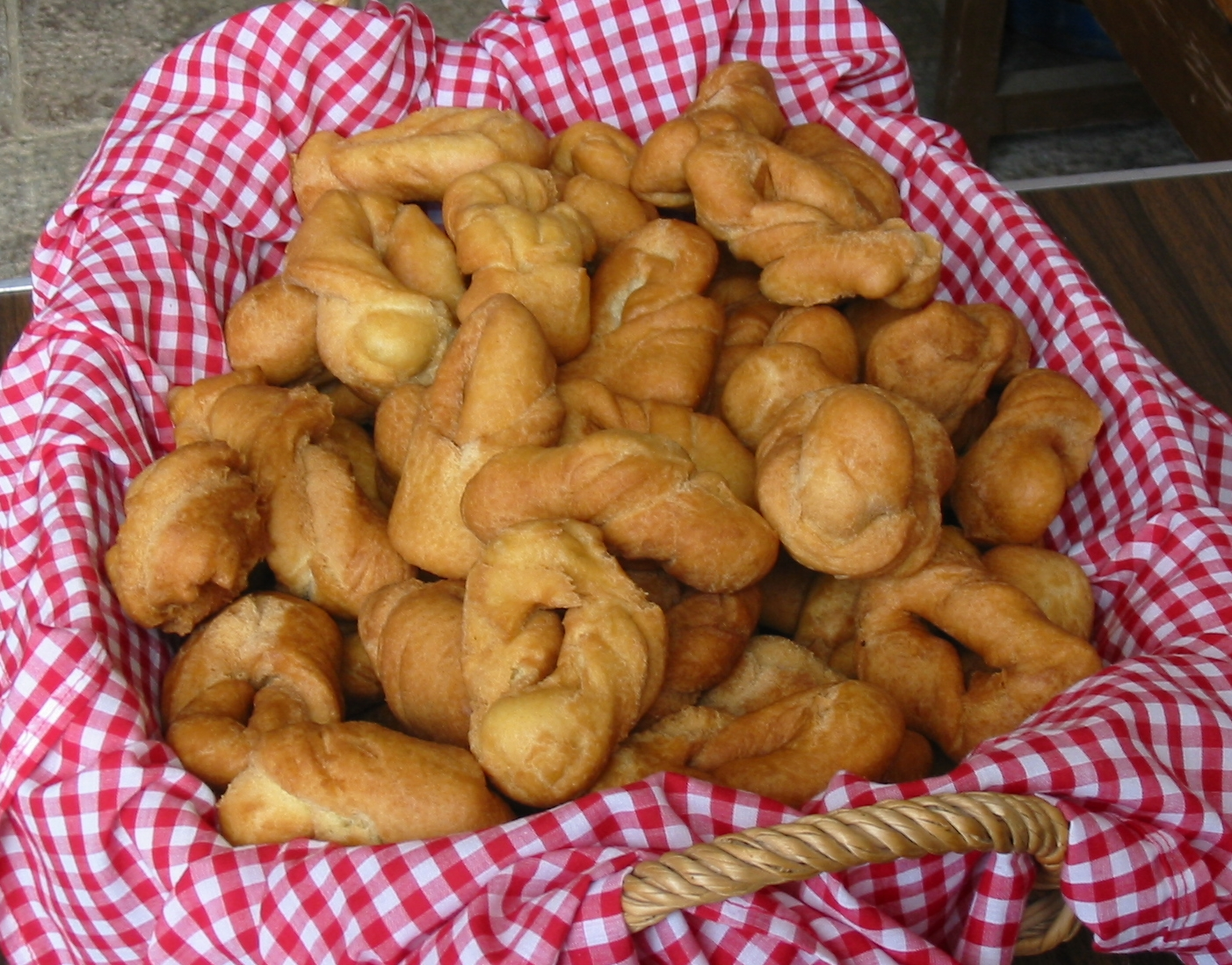
Jersey wonders

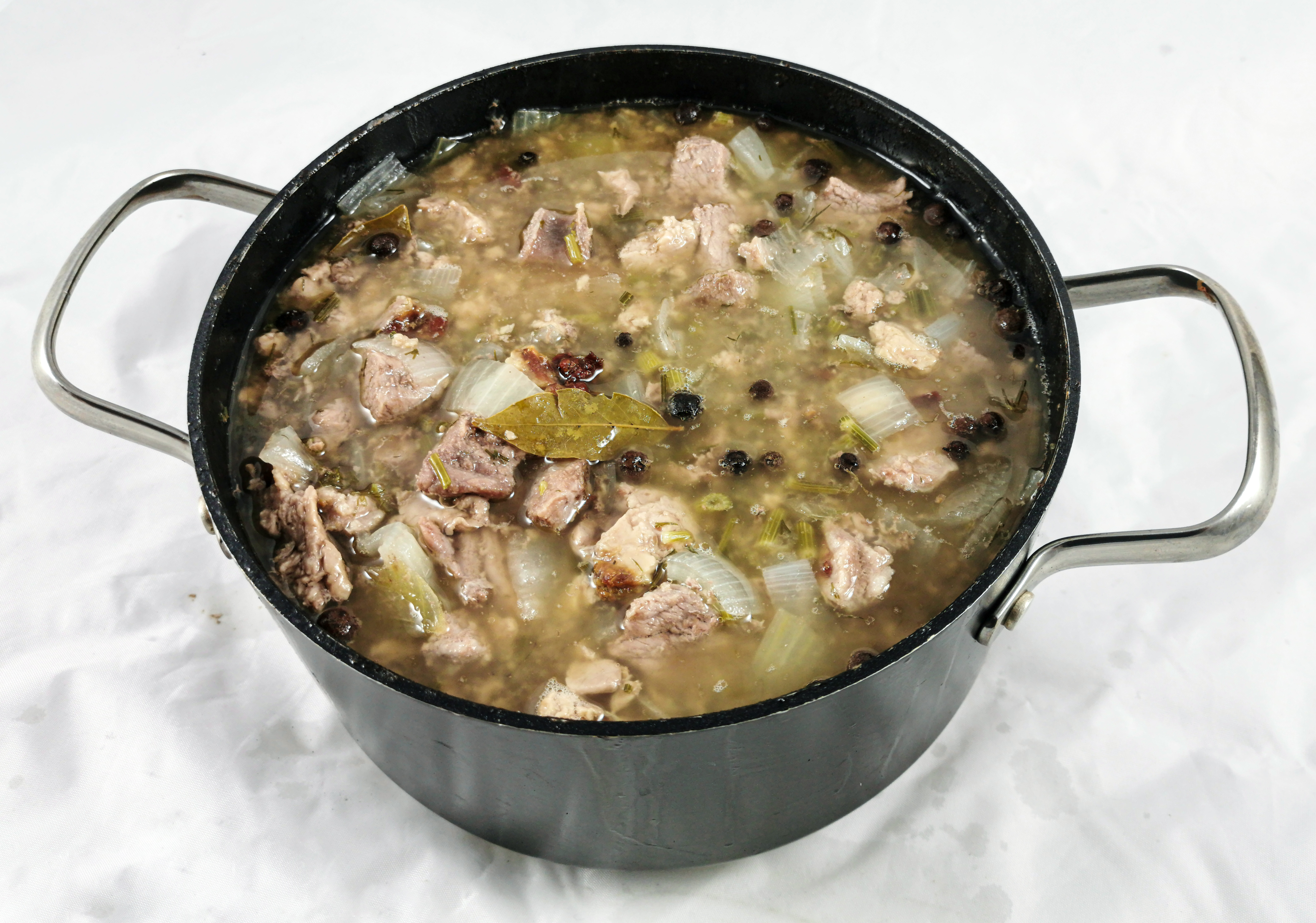
Karelian hot pot

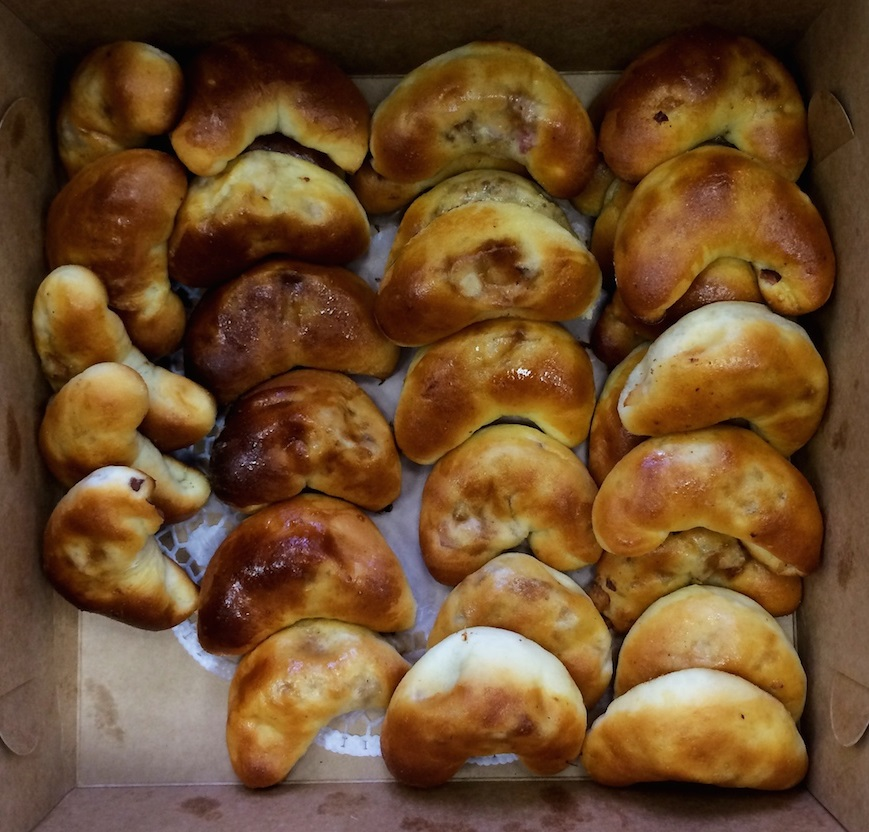
Latvian speķrauši

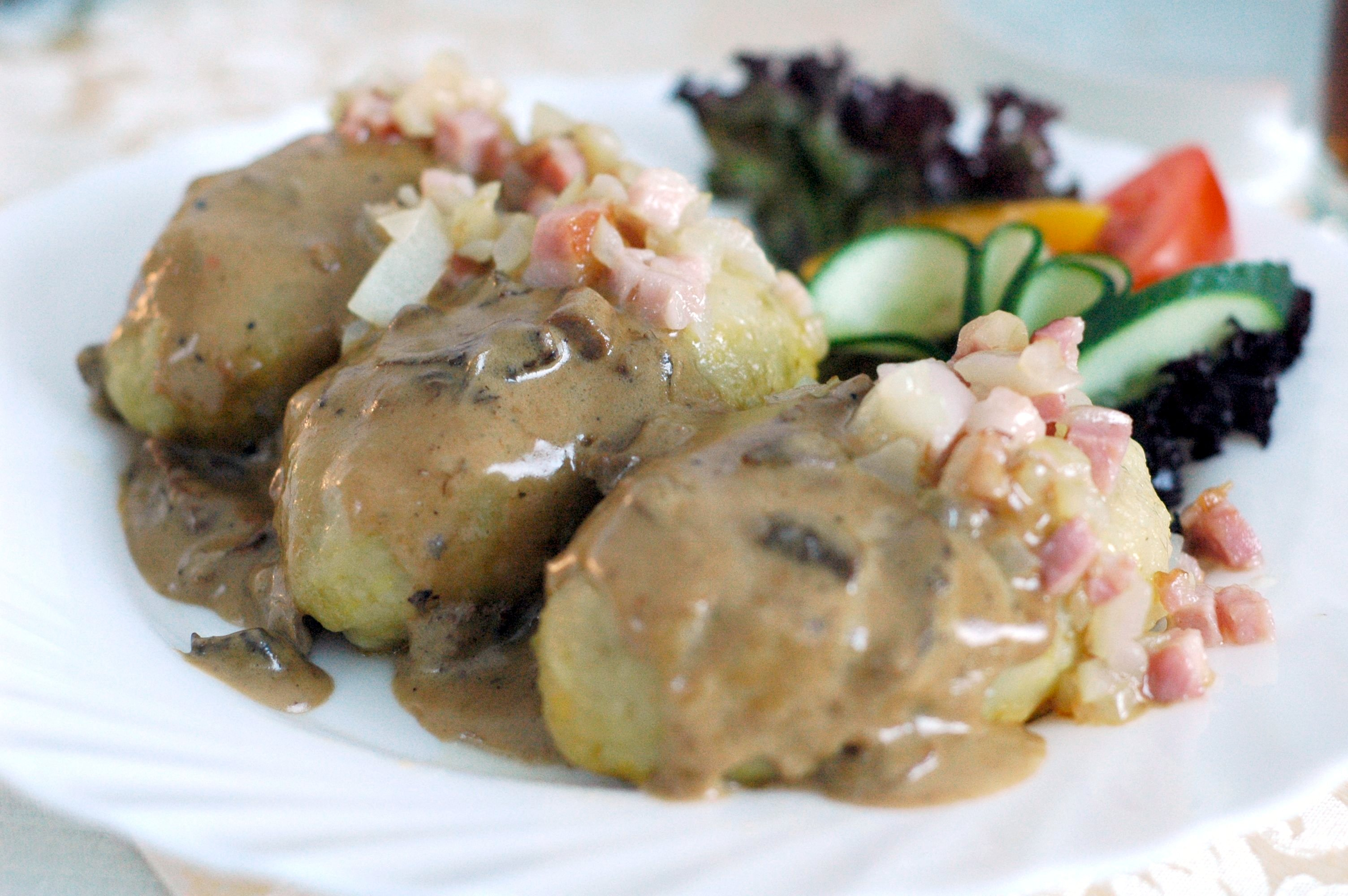
Lithuanian cepelinai

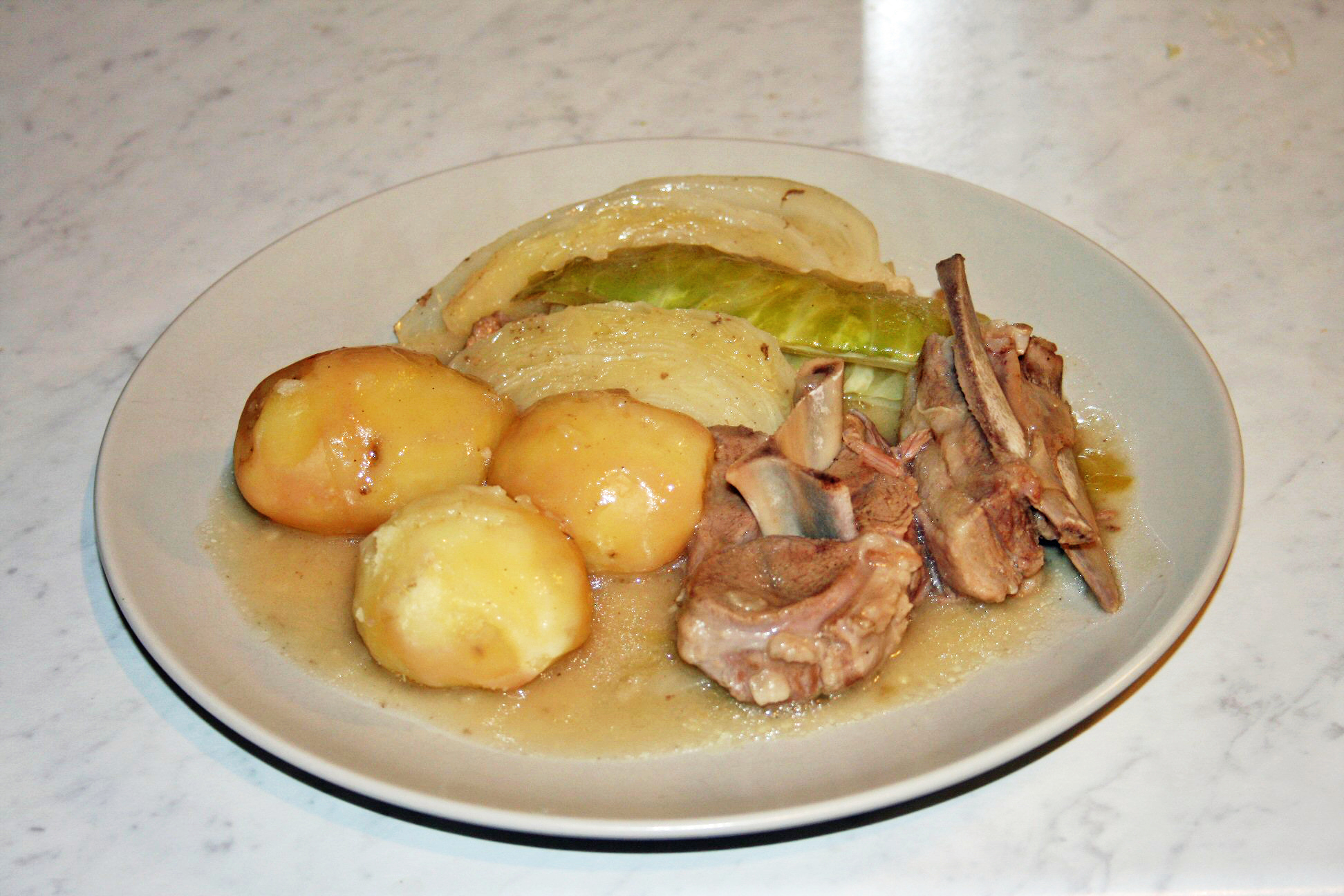
Norwegian fårikål

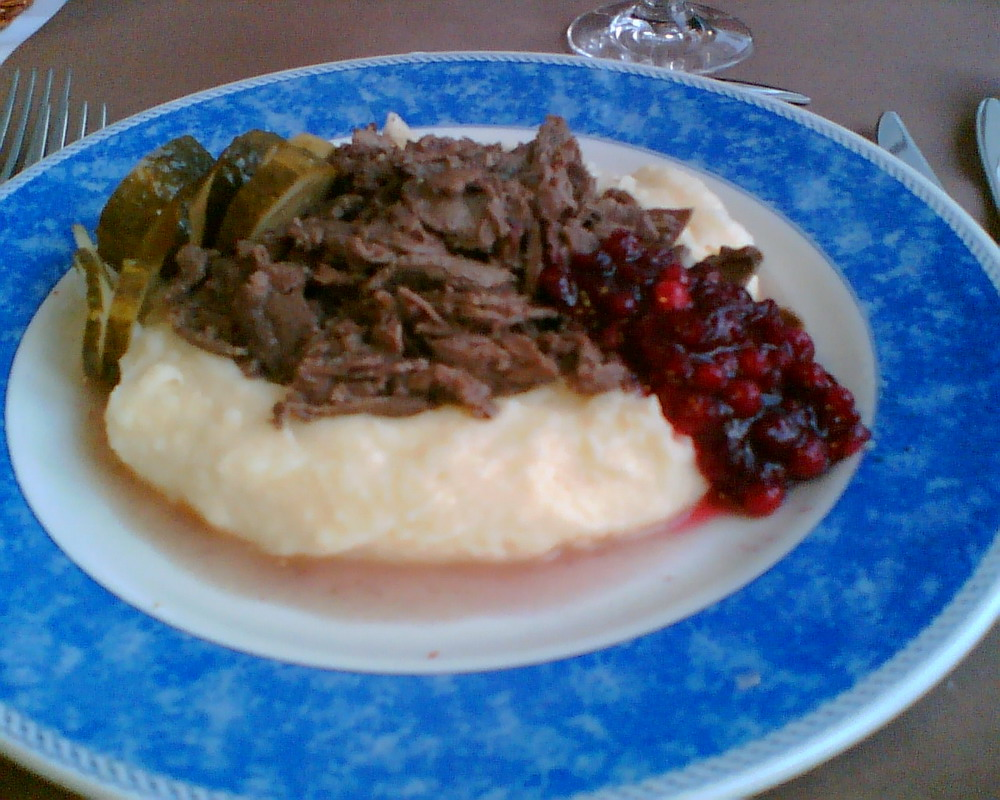
Sami Sautéed reindeer

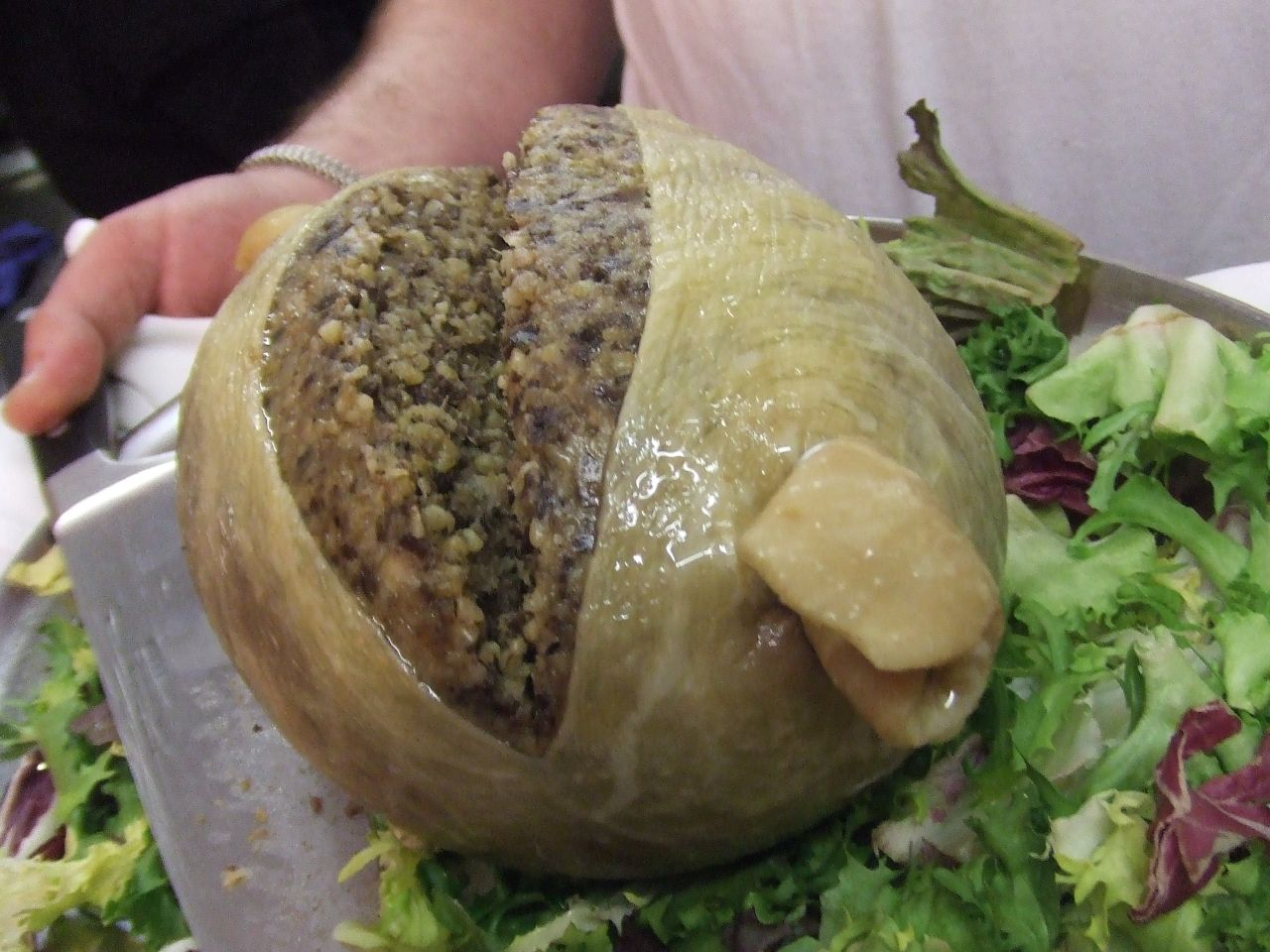
Scottish haggis

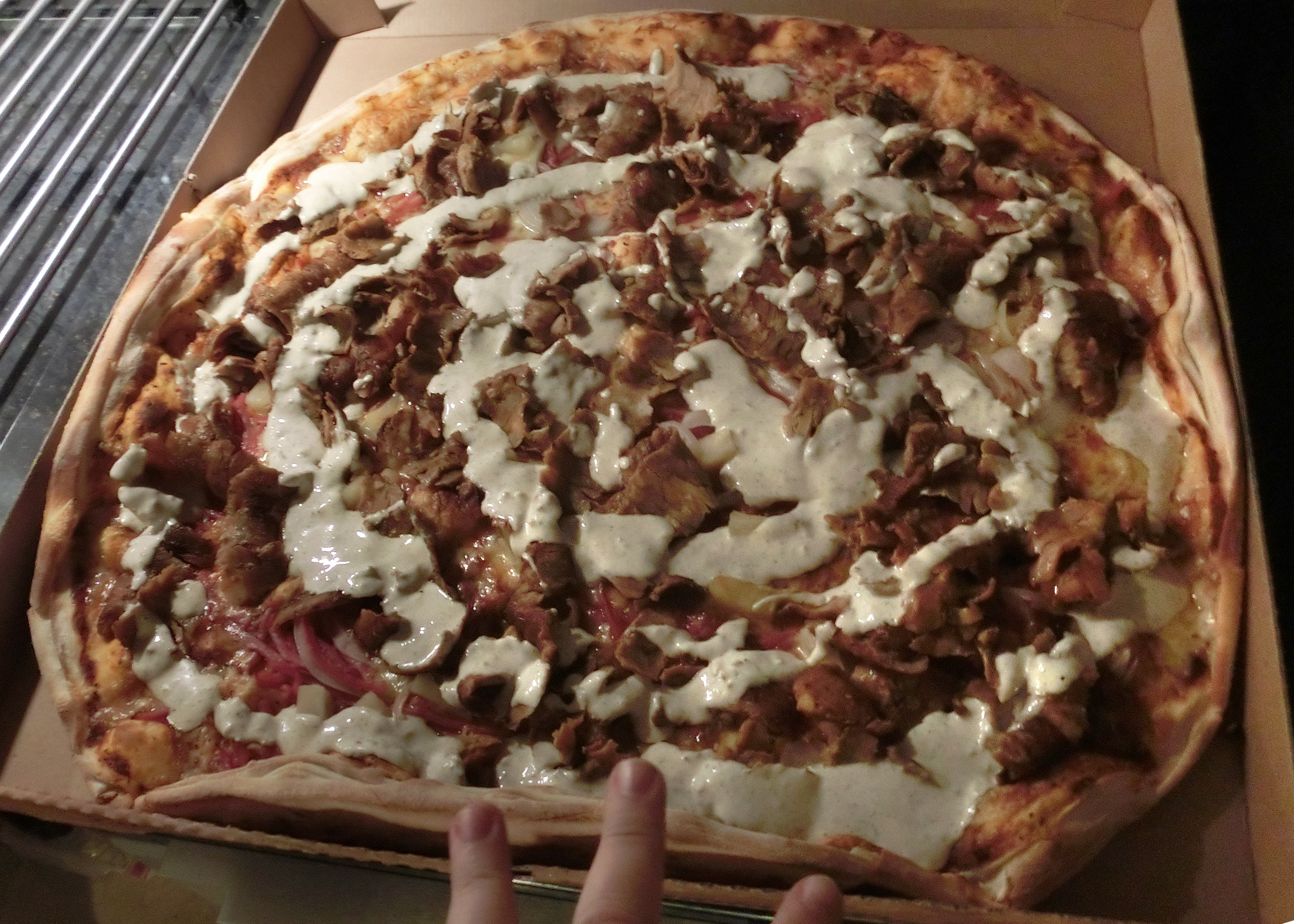
Swedish Kebab pizza

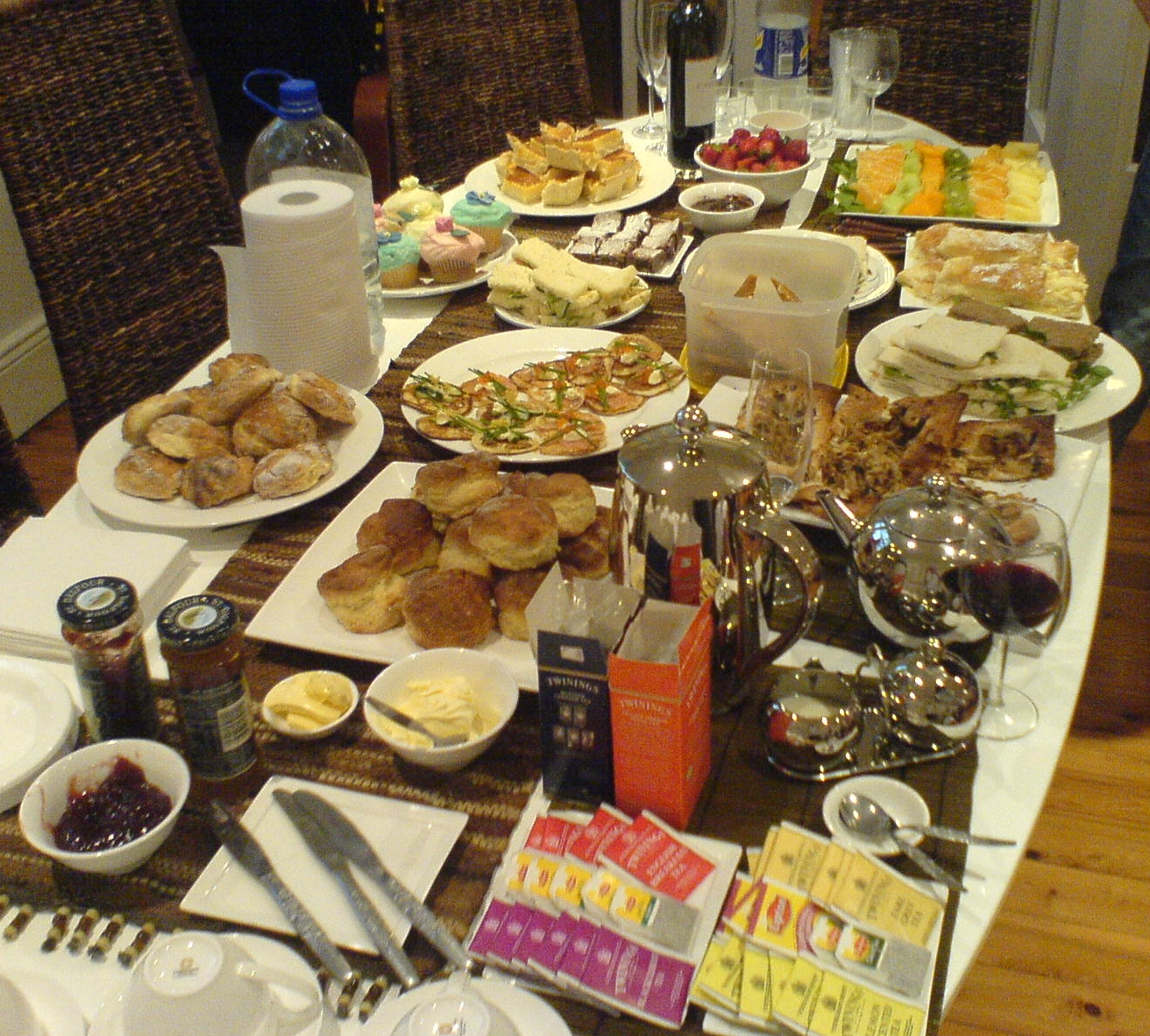
Swedish smörgåsbord

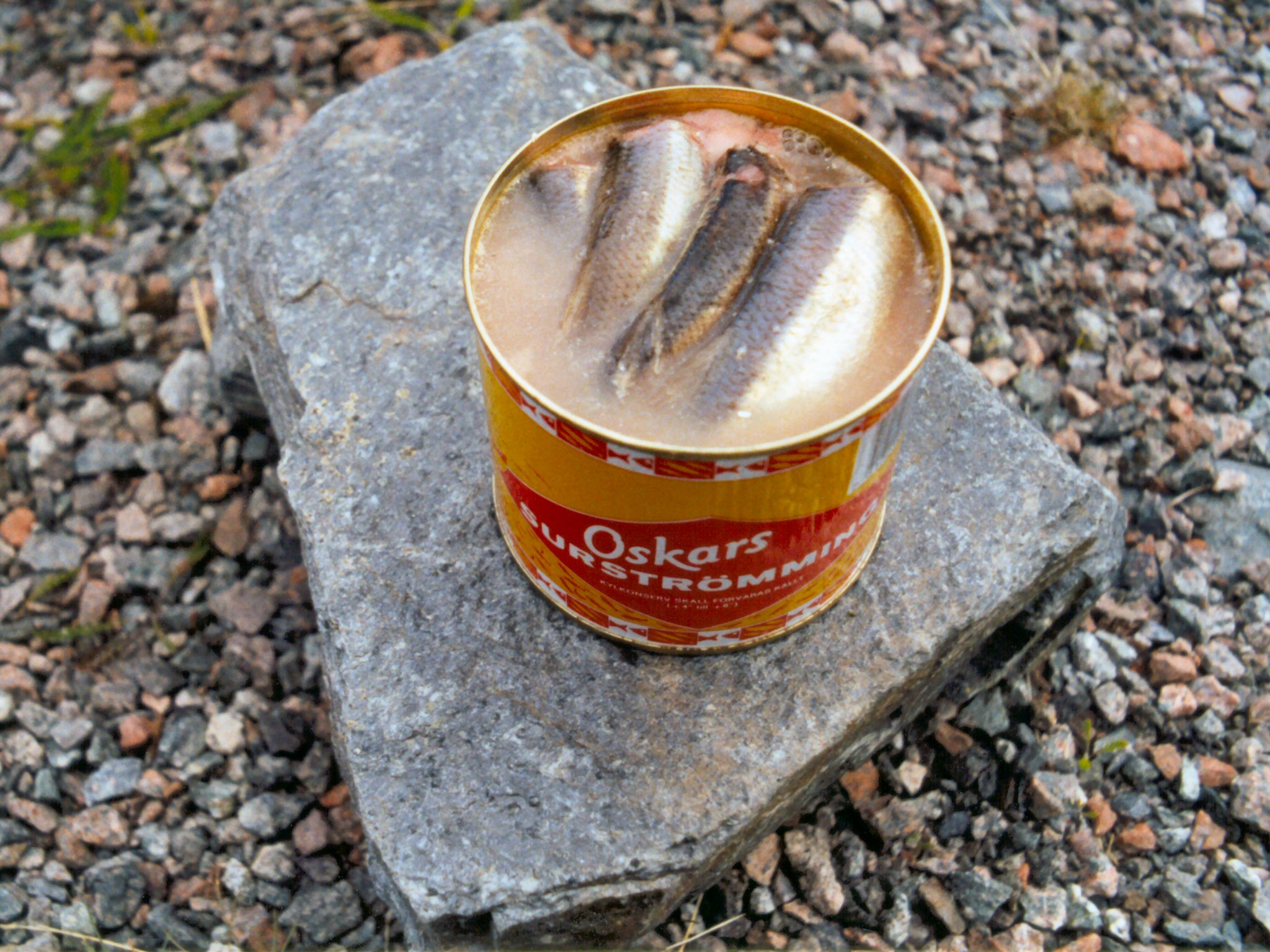
Swedish surströmming

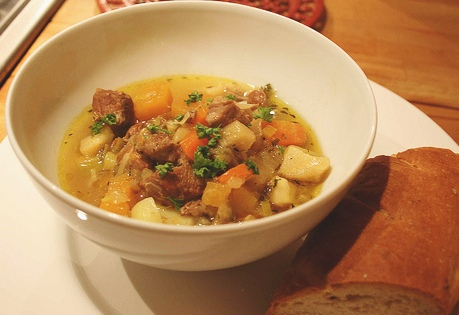
Welsh cawl

== Western European cuisines ==
- (Belgium) Belgian cuisine
- (Netherlands) Dutch cuisine
- (France) French cuisine
  - (Corsica) Corsican cuisine
  - Cuisine of Gascony
  - Haute cuisine
    - Cuisine classique
    - Nouvelle cuisine
      - Cuisine minceur
  - Cuisine and specialties of Nord-Pas-de-Calais
  - (Lyon) Lyonnaise cuisine
  - Picardy cuisine
- Frisian cuisine
- (Limburg (Belgium)) (Limburg (Netherlands)) Limburgian cuisine
- (Luxembourg) Luxembourgian cuisine
- Mennonite cuisine
- (Monaco) Monégasque cuisine
- Occitan cuisine
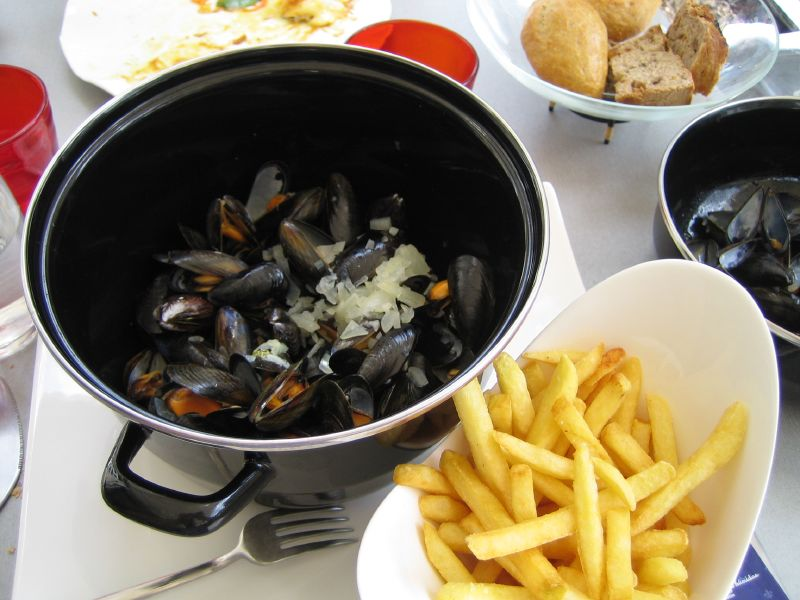
Belgian moules-frites

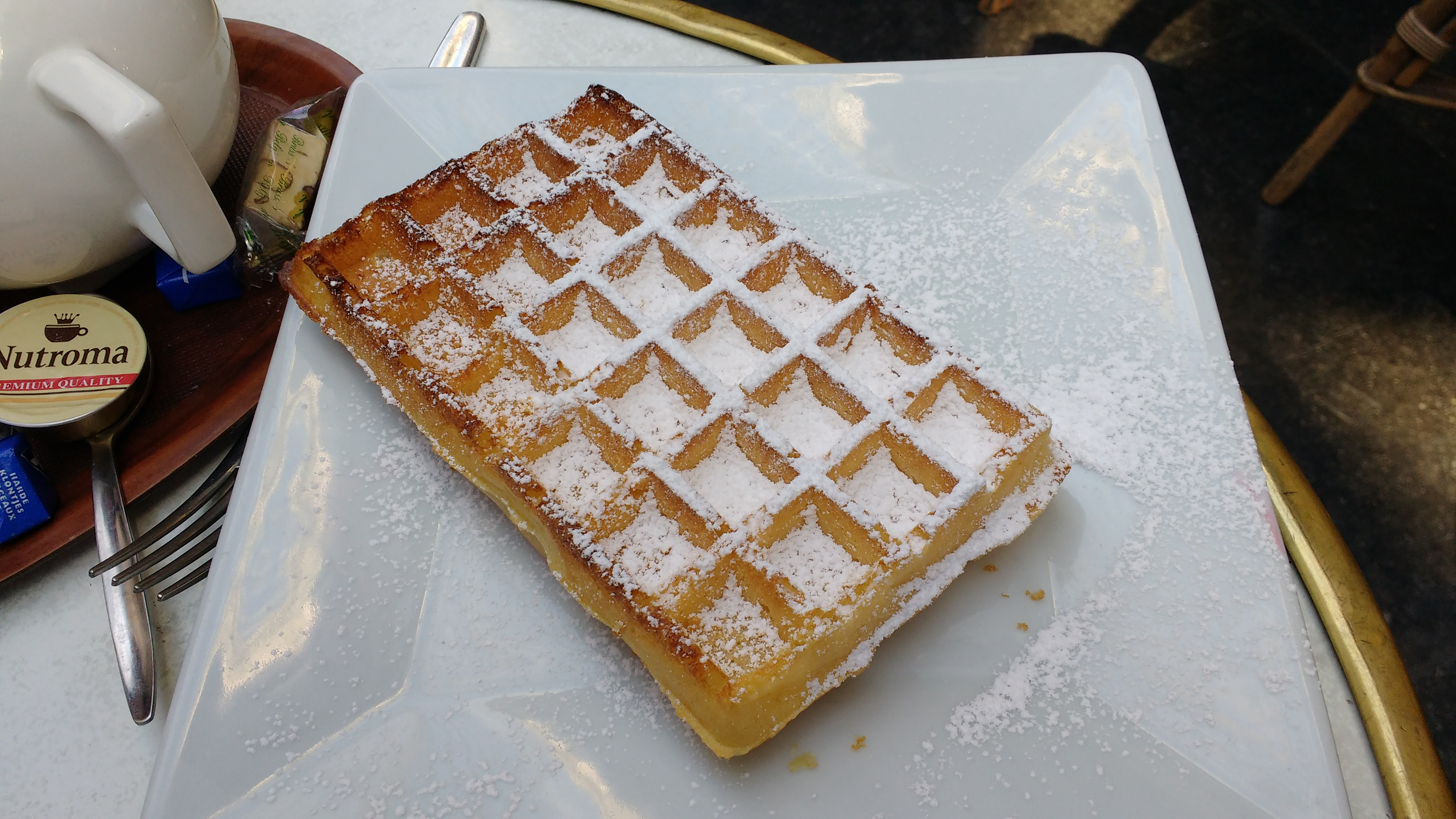
Belgian waffle

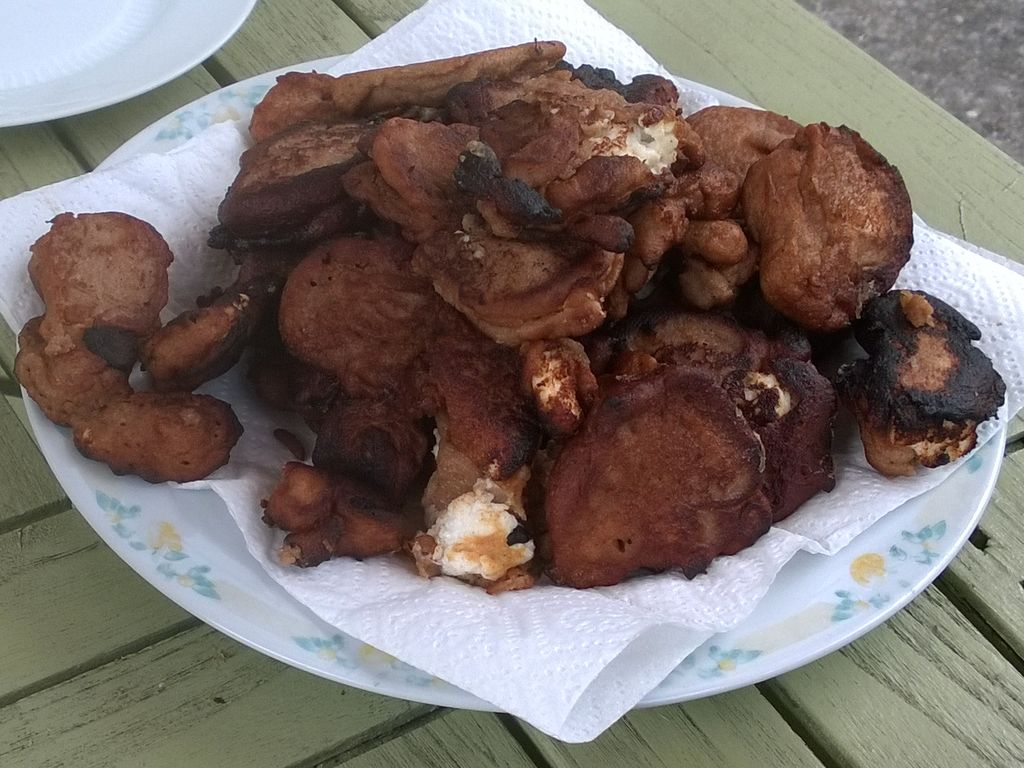
Corsican fritelli

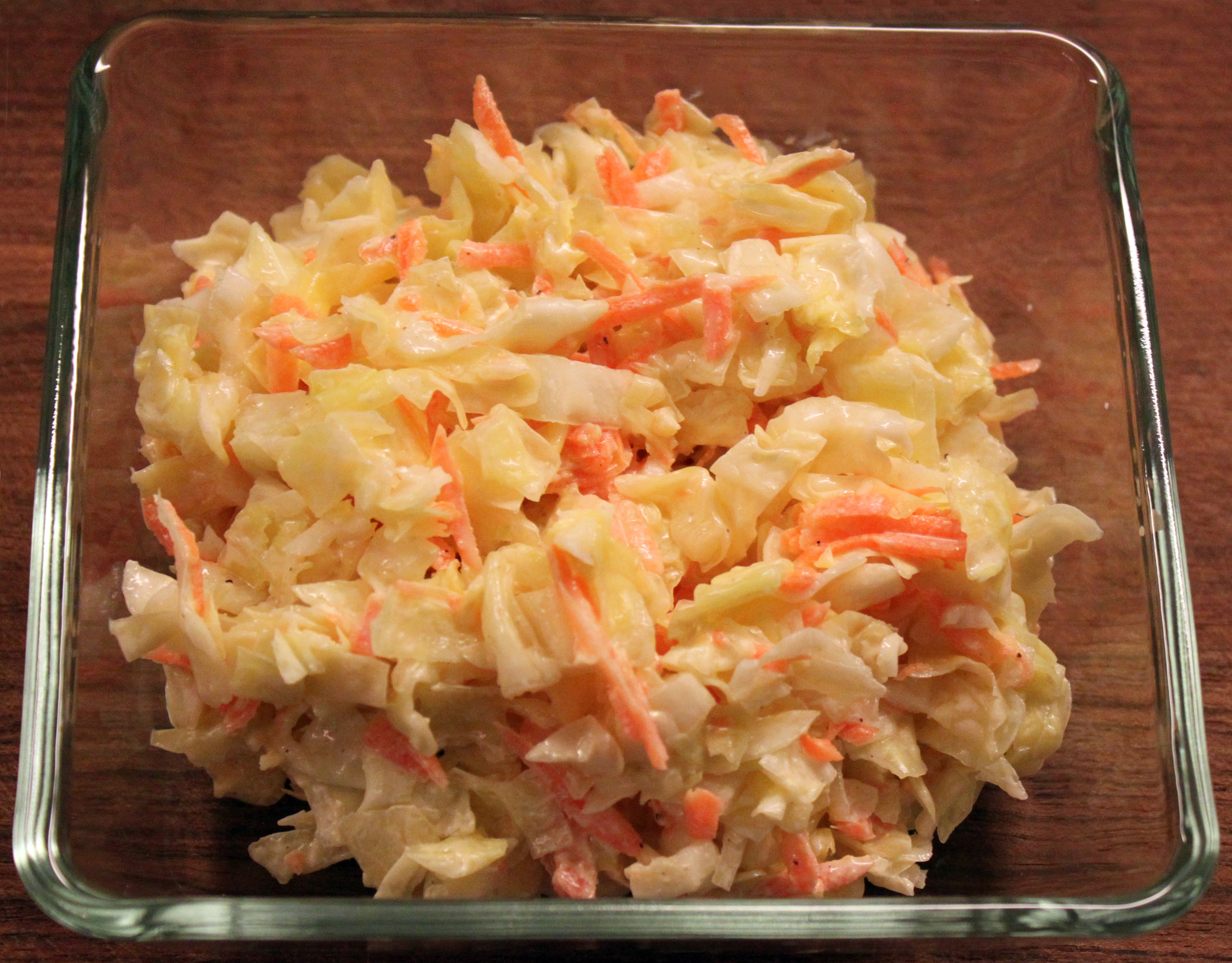
Dutch coleslaw

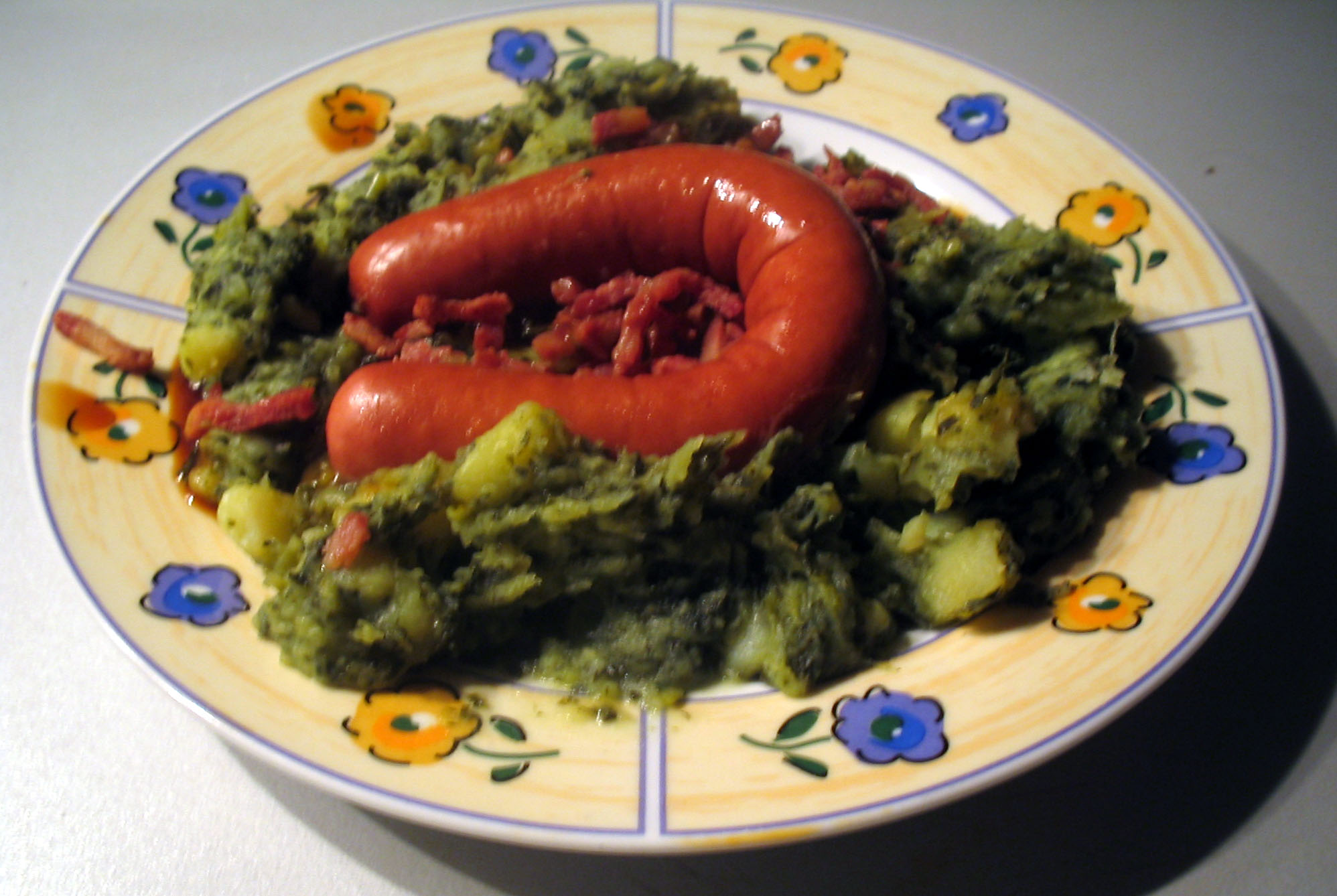
Dutch stamppot with rookworst

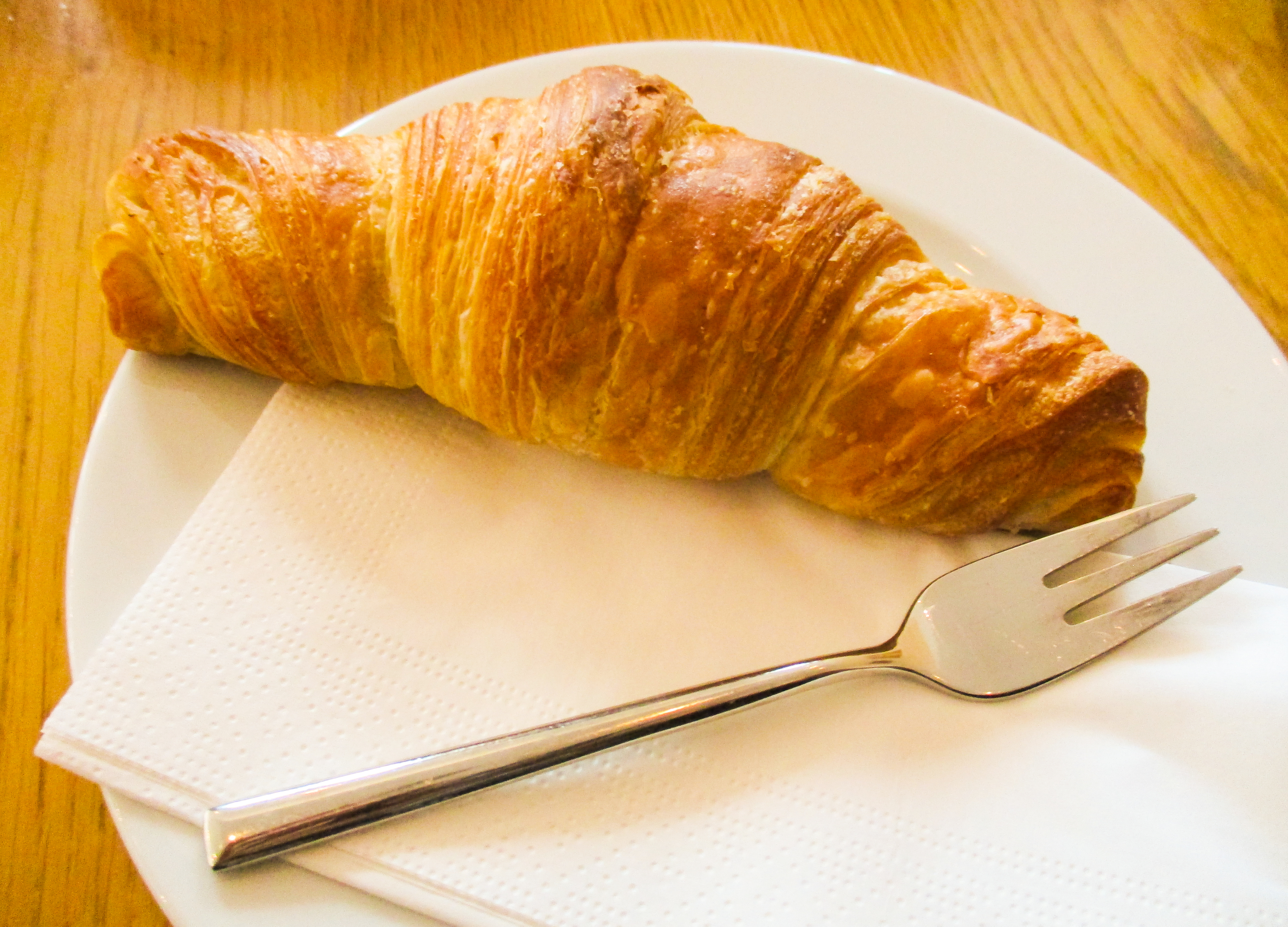
French croissant

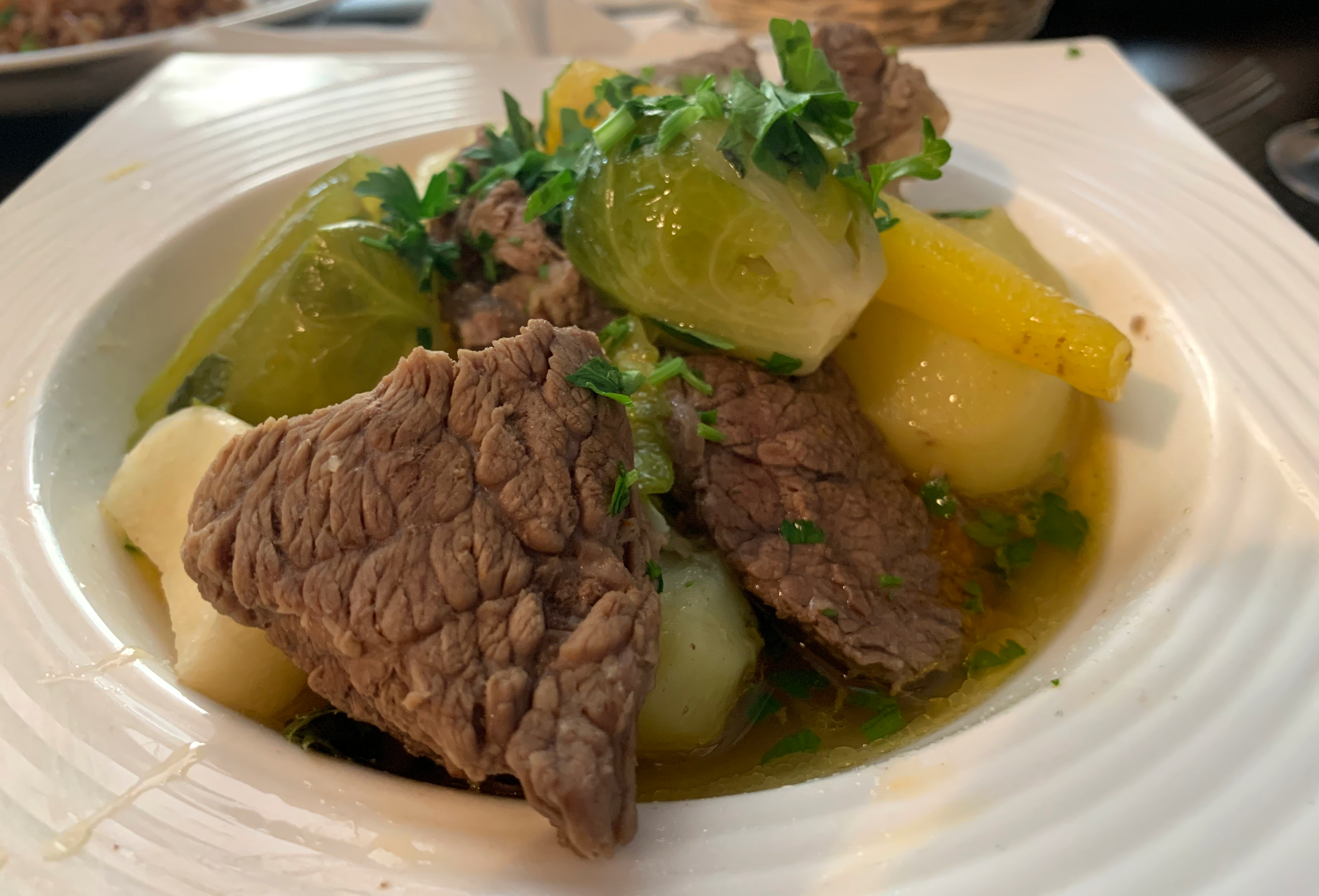
French pot-au-feu

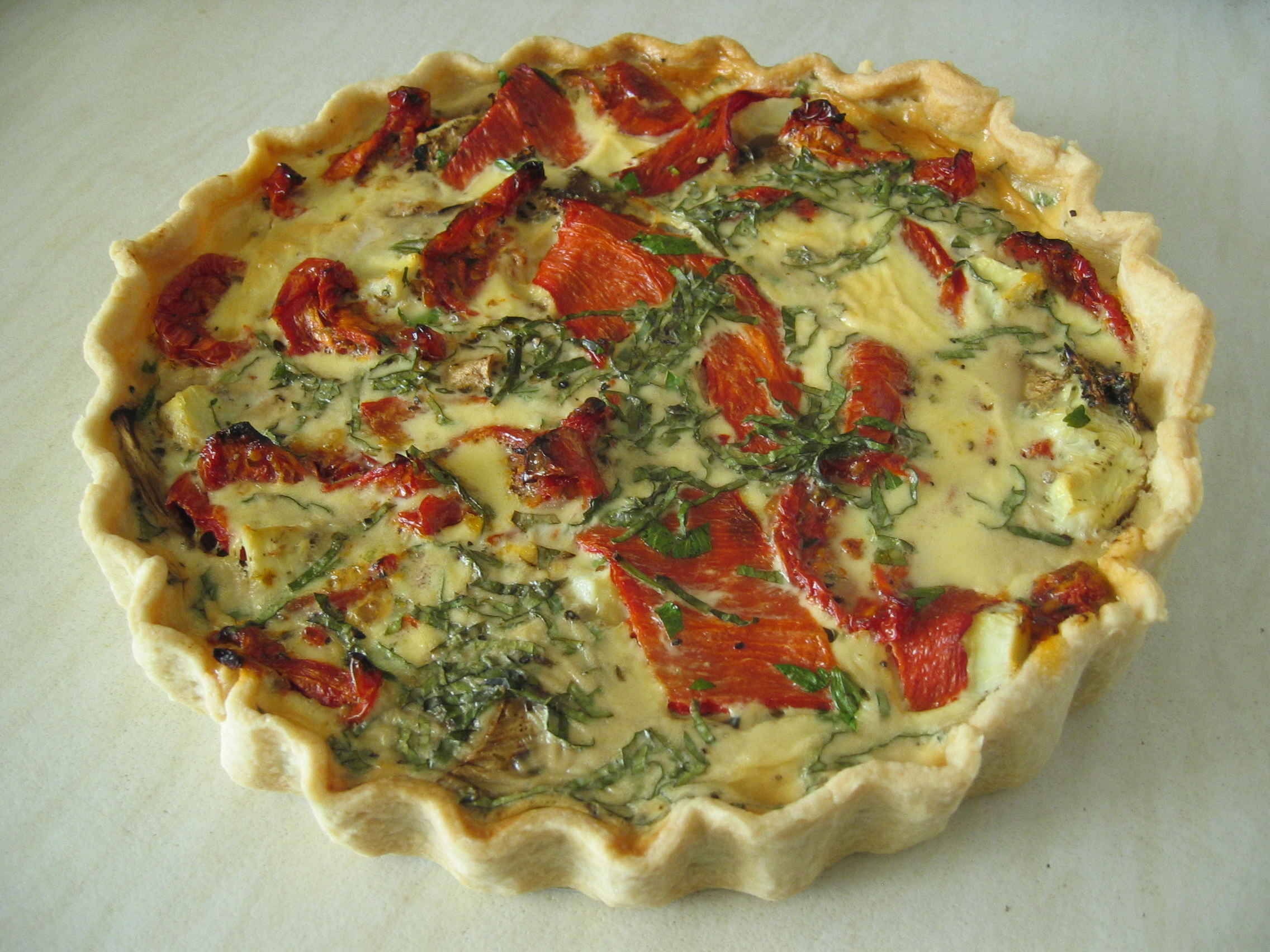
French quiche

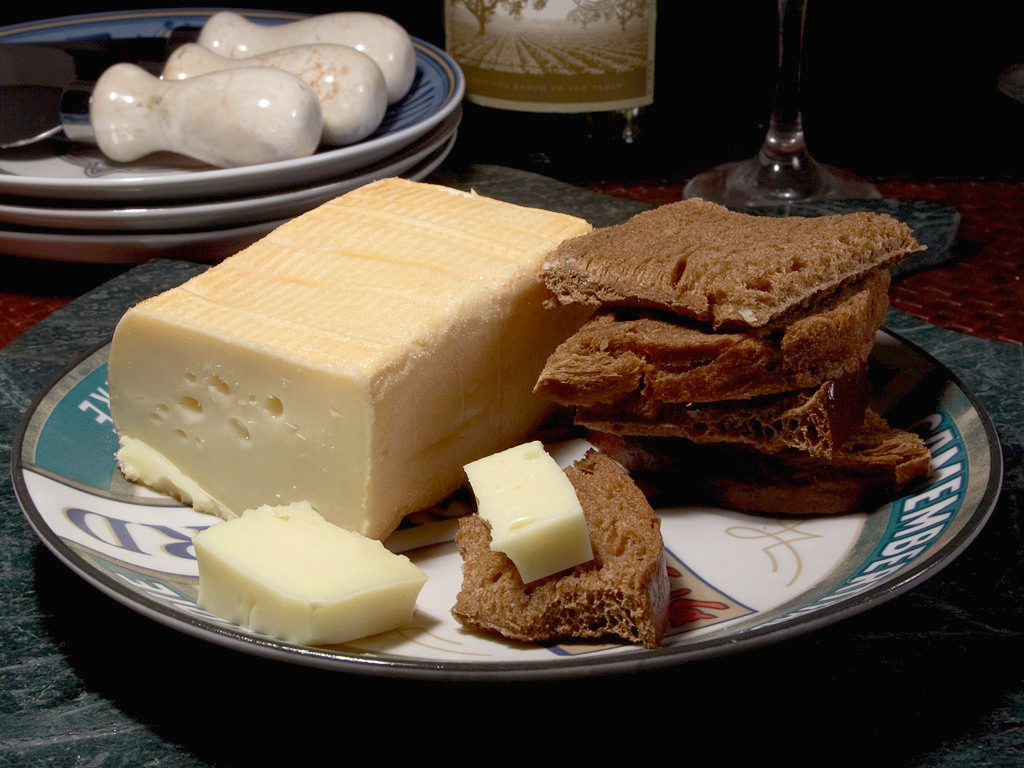
Limburger cheese

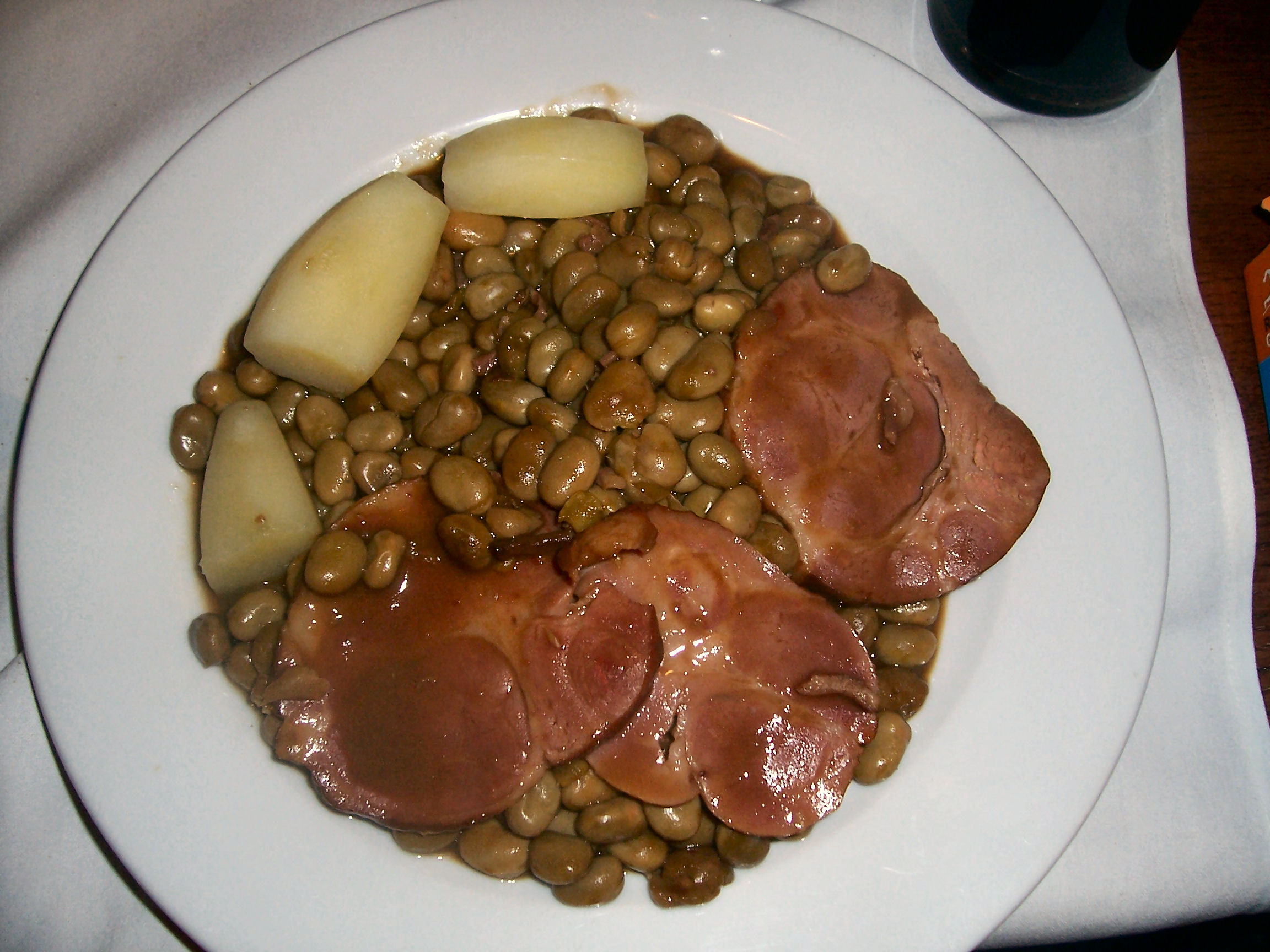
Luxembourgian Judd mat Gaardebounen

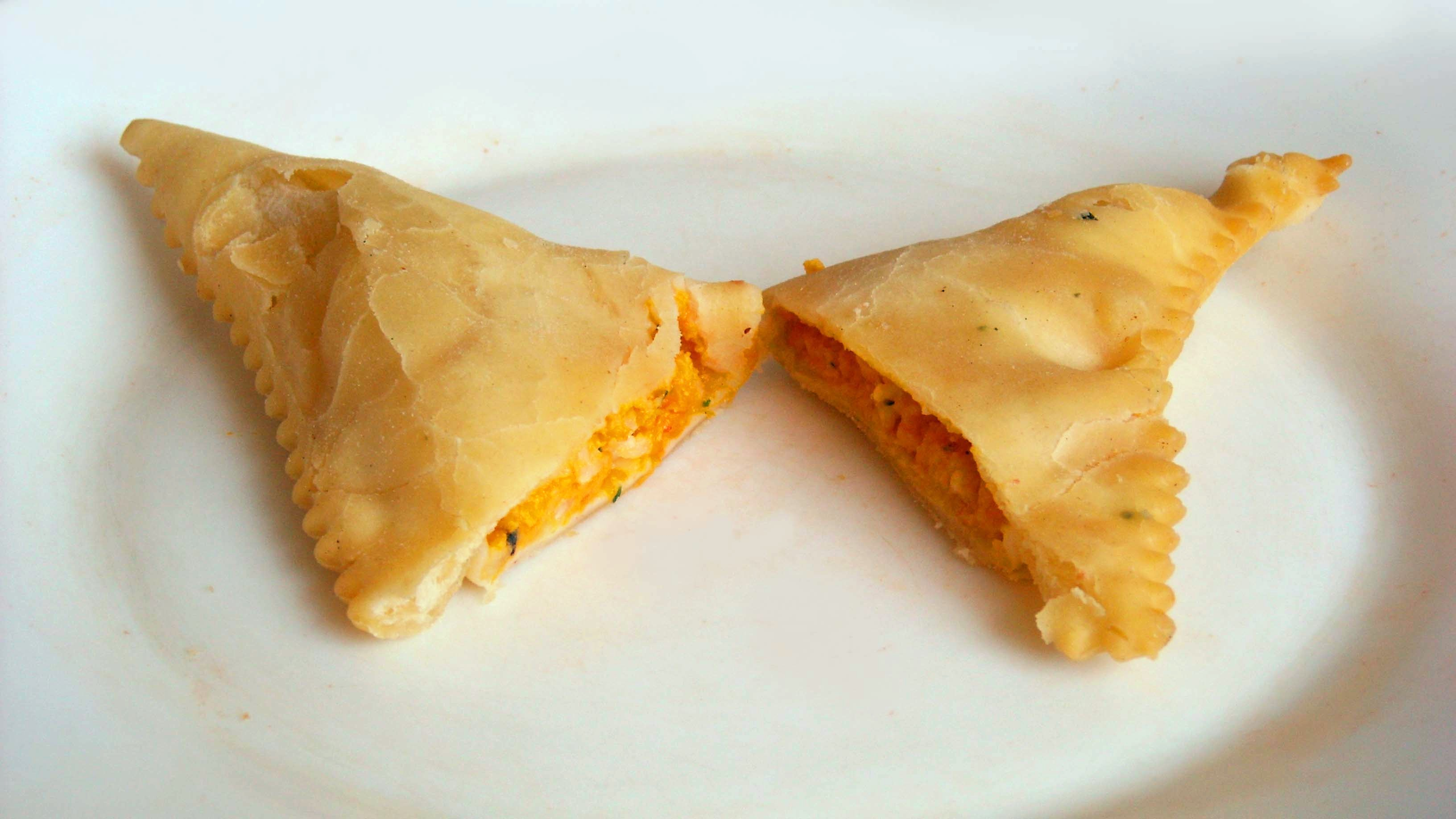
Monégasque Barbajuan

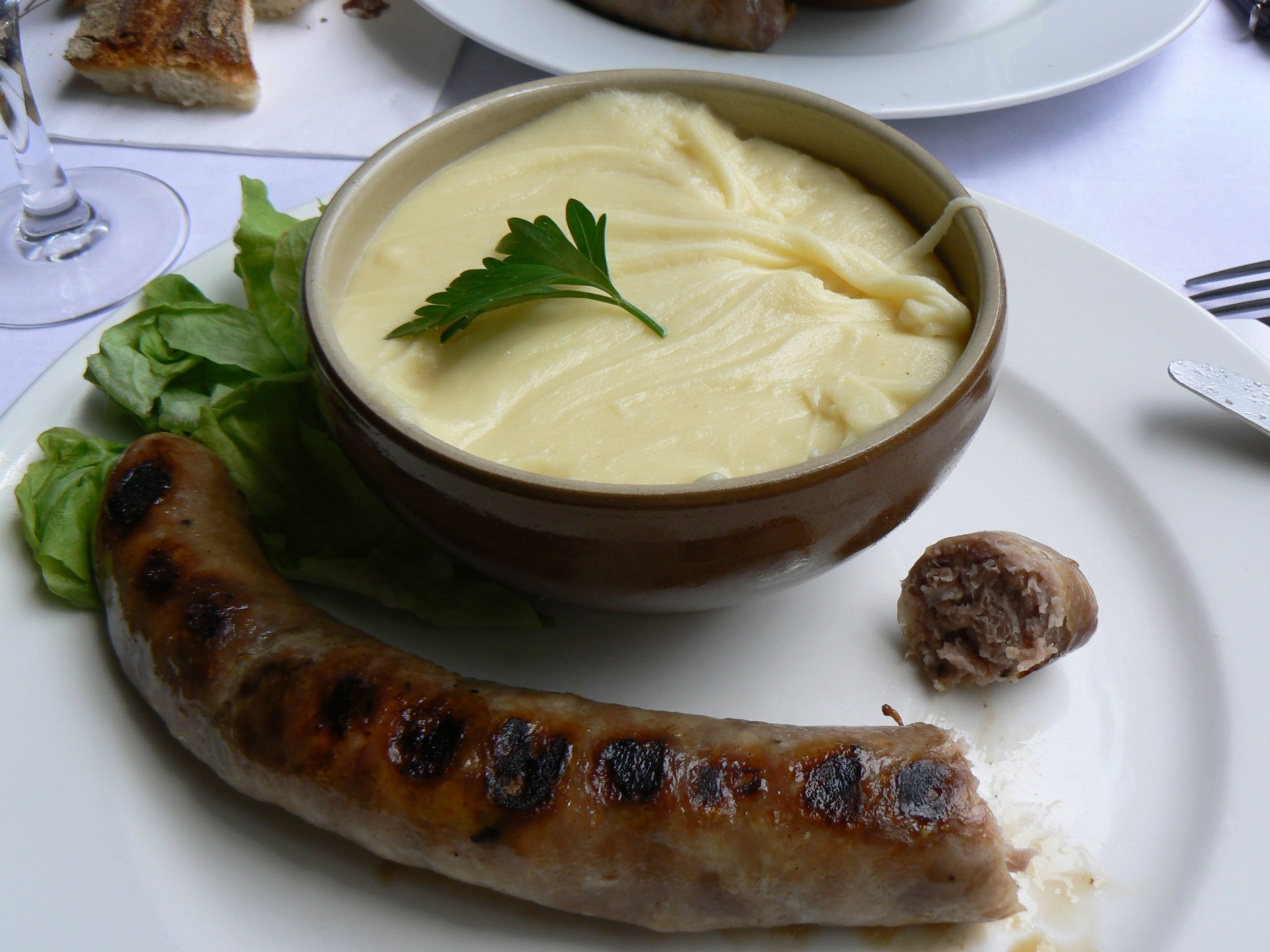
Occitan aligot

== See also ==
- Early modern European cuisine
- Roman cuisine
- Medieval cuisine
- Romani cuisine
- Soviet cuisine
- Yoshoku
