= Roanoke-Chowan Pork-Fest =

Coordinates: 36.44457°N 77.09946°W

The Roanoke-Chowan Pork-Fest is an annual regional event held each May since 2002 on the grounds of the Brady C. Jefcoat Museum in Murfreesboro, North Carolina. It is noted as a showcase to sample the type of cooking the region is famous for.

Largely a barbecue cooking contest, funds from the event benefit the maintenance and operation of the Museum. Judgement of the winner is performed by 3 certified, licensed judges selected from a list of approved judges from the North Carolina Pork Council.

In 2010, the first place prize was awarded as a tie for the first time to Fred Woodard of Smithfield, Virginia and J.W. Condon of Newport, North Carolina. The competition is sanctioned by the North Carolina Pork Council and is part of the Whole Hog Barbecue Series where the winners of this competition compete for the state championship in Raleigh each October. Several winners of the Roanoke-Chowan Pork-Fest have won the state championship including one year where the first, second and third place winners of the state championship were from this competition.

No event was held 2020-2023 because of the pandemic but it was reinstated in 2024.

== See also ==
- Pig pickin'
- North Carolina Barbecue Society
- Barbecue in North Carolina
- Lexington Barbecue Festival
