= Dukes Bar-B-Que =

Barbecue restaurants in South Carolina

Coordinates: 33°29′25″N 80°50′33″W

Dukes Bar-B-Que is the name of numerous unrelated barbecue restaurants in South Carolina, all founded by descendants of Manuel Dukes.

== History ==
The sons of Manuel Dukes, who was born in rural Orangeburg County, South Carolina around 1875, became noted pitmasters in the area and catered events which became a family business. The Dukes were of German origin, and historians have suggested that this may have influenced their use of mustard-based barbecue sauce, something which became common among other German families in the Midlands of South Carolina. Their barbecue is considered typical of the Midlands-style. Over time, the Dukes became known for serving "rust" sauce which includes both mustard and tomato.

In the 1950s, Manuel Dukes' sons and daughters began to found restaurants in cities like Orangeburg, Cameron, Charleston, and Aiken. The first of these restaurants were founded by Danny Dukes in the towns of Cope and Branchville. A more well known restaurant was founded by Earl Duke on the intersection of Chestnut Street and Columbia Road in Orangeburg in 1955. The restaurant later moved to Whitman Street. The extended family of the Dukes' also founded numerous "Dukes" restaurants around that time, based on the success of the name. They have since become a well known part of Orangeburg's restaurant scene. As of 2017, some Dukes restaurants were still owned by members of the family while others had been sold.

The restaurants are based around all-you-can-eat buffet-style dining. They are known for dishes like pulled pork, fried chicken, hash and rice, and other side dishes including collard greens, mac and cheese, black-eyed peas, hushpuppies, corn nuggets, potato salad, coleslaw and white bread.

== See also ==
- Barbecue in South Carolina
