= Melton's Barbecue =

Restaurant information
- Established: 1924
- Closed: 2005
- Food type: Eastern North Carolina barbecue Whole hog barbecue
- Location: Rocky Mount, North Carolina

Melton's Barbecue was a restaurant in Rocky Mount, North Carolina. It opened in 1924, and was the first sit-down barbecue restaurant in North Carolina. It closed in 2005 after being damaged by hurricanes and suffering from economic downturns.

== History ==
The restaurant was founded by Bob Melton, a horse trader from Rocky Mount, North Carolina. He would cook whole hog barbecue for his friends in an open pit near the Tar River, and later began selling meat by the pound to townspeople. He opened a restaurant in 1922 or 1924. Melton's Barbecue was the first dine-in barbecue restaurant in North Carolina, and became popular with local residents. The restaurant was originally a large shed, built by Melton, which was later expanded over the years. The restaurant was also a popular caterer for social gatherings. North Carolina food writer Beth Tartan wrote that "When a woman who lives in Raleigh is having company, she calls up Bob Melton's and says: 'Ride me a party.' That means Melton's will put barbecue and fixings on the bus for her."

As of 1929, a plate of barbecue with boiled potatoes cost 45 cents, while a barbecue sandwich cost 15 cents. In 1988, a plate of barbecue with coleslaw, hushpuppies, and Brunswick stew cost $34.

In later years, Melton retired from cooking and became a greeter for the restaurant. After Melton died in 1958, the restaurant was owned by his business partners W.B. Melton, T. O. Fulghum, and Add Smith.

In his 1993 book Southern Food, John Egerton noted that the restaurant had stopped cooking its food over charcoal, instead using gas and woodchips as fuel. Egerton observed that the change was controversial and suggested that it resulted in an inferior flavor.

The restaurant was located in a low-lying area that flooded easily. On occasions where the area was flooded by the Tar River, customers needed to use boats to reach the restaurant. In 1997, the restaurant was flooded by Hurricane Fran. The restaurant reopened ten days after the storm and began serving customers, who were only able to access the restaurant by boat because of the flood waters. The damage from the flooding was repaired eight months later and a plaque was added to show the high water mark inside the restaurant during the storm.

In 1999, the restaurant celebrated its 75th anniversary. That year, the restaurant was forced to relocate due to flooding caused by Hurricane Floyd. The floodwaters rose higher than the restaurant's ceiling and the building was covered in silt. The restaurant subsequently relocated to a strip mall, although it struggled to remain profitable due to a worsening economy in the region. It closed in 2005.

== Description ==
The restaurant specialized in Eastern North Carolina barbecue, which it helped to popularize as an alternative to Lexington-style barbecue. It prepared whole hog barbecue with sides such as boiled potatoes, coleslaw, cornsticks, hushpuppies, and Brunswick stew. The restaurant used small hogs, weighing between 80 and 90 pounds. The meat was finely chopped and seasoned with a vinegar based barbecue sauce. A 1988 article from Boating described the meat as having "the consistency of chopped peanut butter".
