= North Carolina Barbecue Society =

American non-profit organization

The North Carolina Barbecue Society (NCBS) is a non-profit organization created to promote North Carolina culture and food. They are based in Winston-Salem, North Carolina, United States, One of the goals of the organization is to promote barbecue related cultural events such as the Tar Heel Barbecue Classic and the Lexington Barbecue Festival, as well as promote the barbecue culture of North Carolina.

== Mission ==
According to the official website, "The mission of the North Carolina Barbecue Society (NCBS) is to preserve North Carolina’s barbecue history and culture and to secure North Carolina’s rightful place as the Barbecue Capital of the World." A less formal and more commonly heard motto is "to cook and eat barbecue as often as possible, preferably in the company of good friends and to promote the Old North State as the Cradle of 'Cue."

== History ==
The organization was founded in 2006. The president of the organization is founder Jim Early, attorney and author of the self-published book The Best Tar Heel Barbecue: Manteo to Murphy, which is a review of all the restaurants on the "Historic Barbecue Trail", which links 25 barbecue establishments in 21 locales across the state. The organization has three, two-day barbecue cooking boot camps (schools) each year; Tanglewood Park in Clemmons, NC early May, Sugar Mountain Ski Resort near Boone, North Carolina, in July and Castle Haynes near Wilmington, North Carolina, in late September. Boot Camps instruct the attendees how to prepare and cook/smoke whole hog, chicken, steak, pork butt, ribs, brisket, seafood and occasional wild game. Also students are shown how to make Chef Early's award-winning Pimento Cheese.

CNN listed 10 International Cooking Schools in 2012. NCBBQ Society was the only school in the US on the list.

== Barbecue types and politics ==
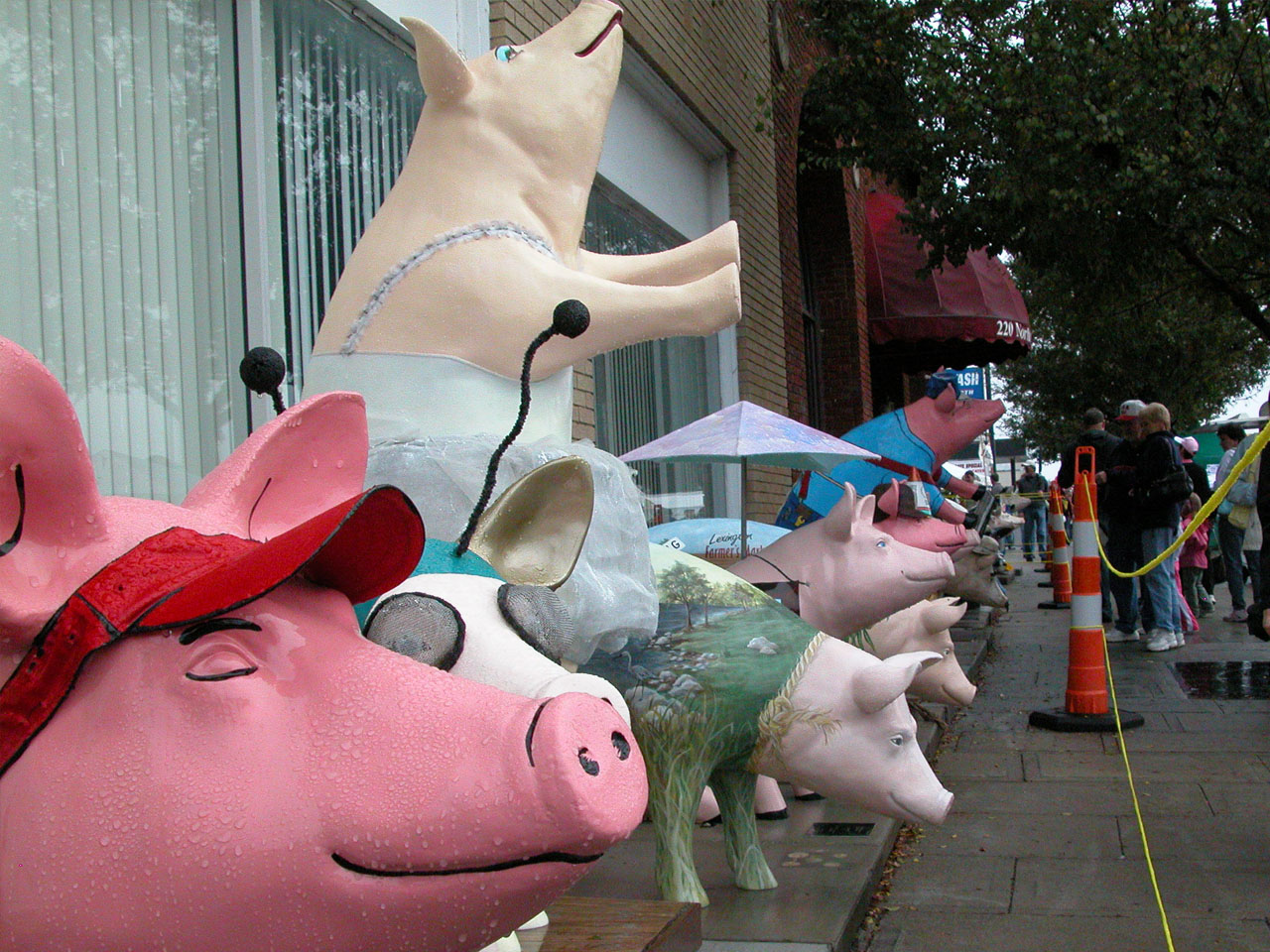
Pigs on parade at the Lexington Barbecue Festival

There are two native barbecue types in North Carolina, Eastern style and Lexington style, and great deal of controversy always surrounds any attempt to create an "official" barbecue type. They both use slow cooking over hardwood coals (usually hickory) but differ in methods. Two bills that would have introduced Lexington Style as the de facto barbecue type of the state met controversy and failure in the State House of Representatives and State Senate in 2006, North Carolina House Bill 21 and North Carolina Senate Bill 47.

Eastern style uses all of the meat from the pig (whole hog), or as it is more informally explained, it uses, '"every part of the hog except the squeal". The sauce can be as simple as vinegar and pepper, and can be mopped on during the cook or used to season the meat after.

Lexington style (also called Piedmont or Western style) uses a vinegar and ketchup type sauce, and uses only the pork shoulder, which is darker meat, thus more moist. It is also served with red slaw, a type of coleslaw that uses this barbecue sauce (locally called "dip") instead of mayonnaise.

== Sponsorship ==
The organization is supported by member dues and by official sponsors. The majority of the official sponsors are barbecue restaurants in the region, which benefit directly from the efforts of the organization.

== See also ==
- Pigs in the City
- Roanoke-Chowan Pork-Fest
