= Cookout =

Cookout may refer to:

- Social gathering for grilling (or barbecuing) outdoors, used primarily in the Southern United States and among Black Americans
- Cook Out (restaurant), a fast food chain based in North Carolina
- "Cookout (Space Ghost Coast to Coast)", an episode of Space Ghost Coast to Coast
- The Cookout, a 2004 film set around a cookout
