= Cook Out (restaurant) =

American quick service chain

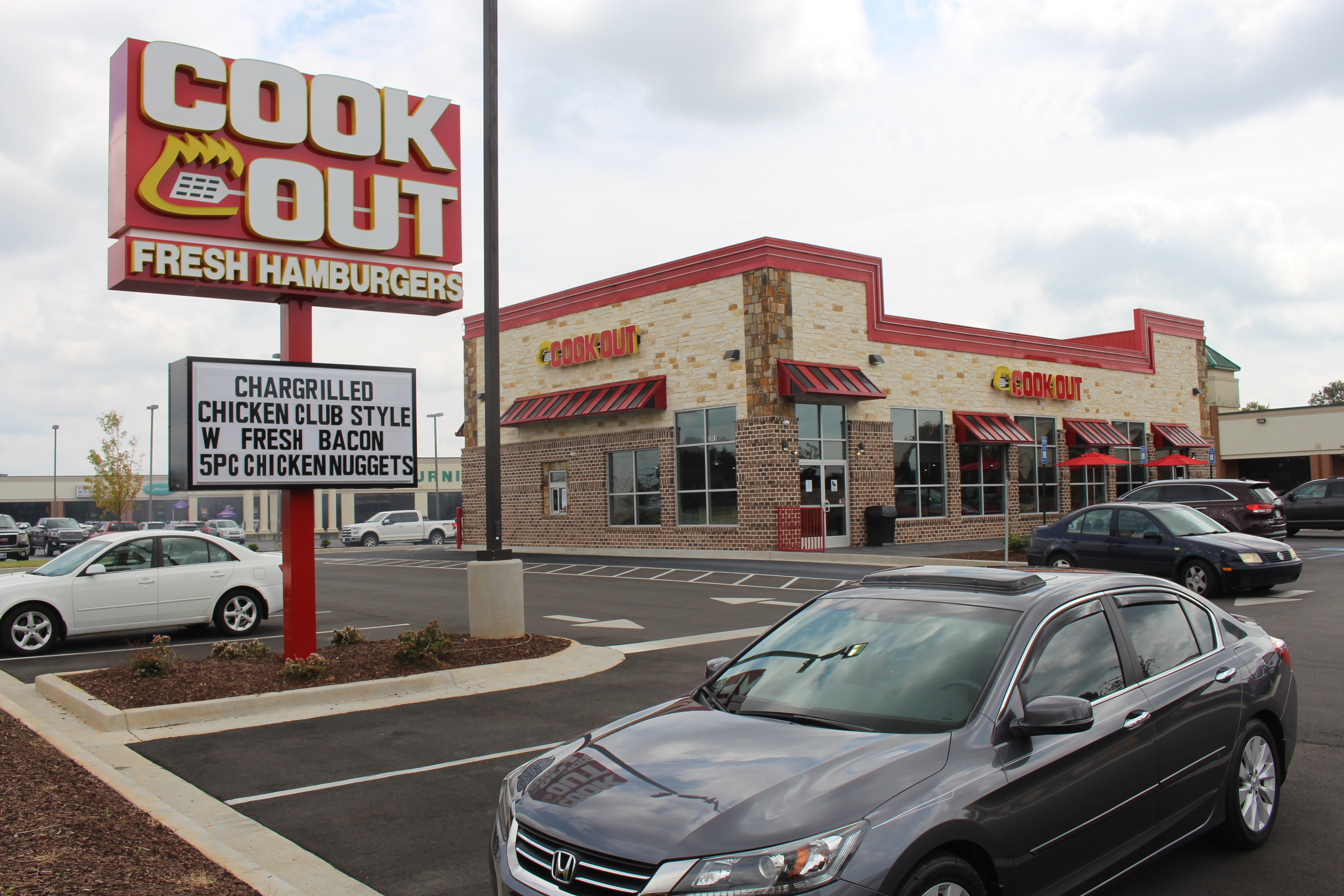
- A newer-style Cook Out restaurant with indoor seating and counter service
- Type: Private
- Industry: Restaurants
- Genre: Quick service restaurant
- Founded: 1989; 37 years ago Greensboro, North Carolina, U.S.
- Founder: Morris Reaves
- Headquarters: Thomasville, North Carolina, U.S.
- Number of locations: 300+
- Area served: Southeastern United States
- Key people: Jeremy Reaves (CEO)
- Products: Hamburgers, hot dogs, french fries, chicken fingers, chicken nuggets, chicken sandwiches, quesadillas, wraps, cheese curds, Carolina-style barbecue, and milkshakes
- Revenue: US$125 million
- Owner: Morris Reaves
- Number of employees: 13,000 as of May 2021
- Website: cookout.com

Cook Out is a privately owned American fast-food restaurant chain operating in North Carolina, South Carolina, Alabama, Florida, Georgia, Kentucky, Maryland, Mississippi, Tennessee, Virginia, and West Virginia. Founded in Greensboro, North Carolina, in 1989, the chain has since expanded and now has restaurants in over 40 cities. The chain itself has grown in size with many locations now spread primarily throughout the Southeastern United States.

The standard format of the restaurant features two drive-thru lanes and a walk-up window, but no indoor seating. Some newer locations have an indoor dining room and counter service similar to a traditional fast-food restaurant, but most still only have drive-thru and walk-up service. The restaurant specializes in hamburgers, milkshakes, and North Carolina–style pork barbecue.

== History ==
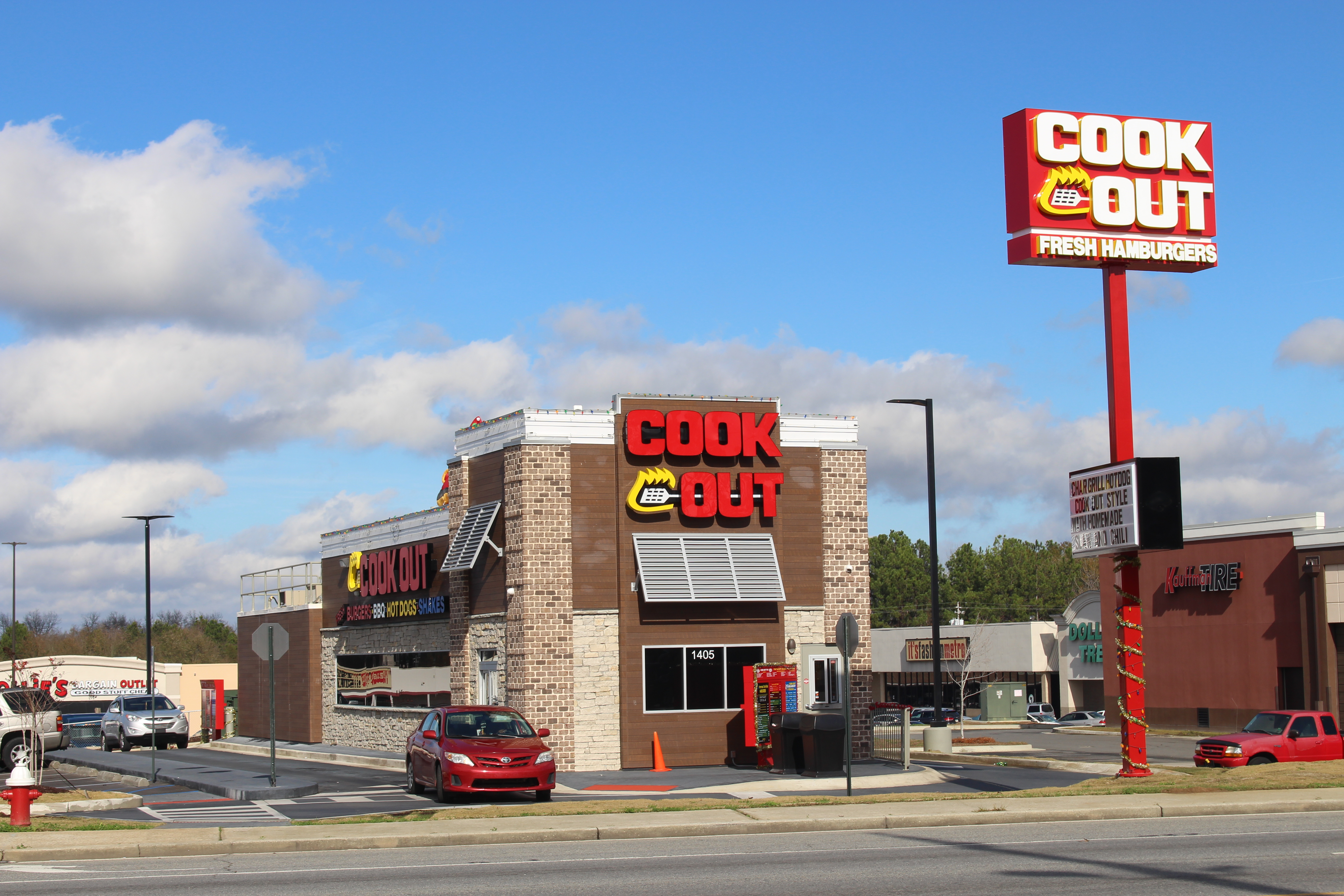
Many Cook Out locations feature only two drive-thru lanes and a walk-up window like this one in Cordele, Georgia.

Morris Reaves founded Cook Out in 1989. He is the owner of the company, and his son, Jeremy Reaves, is the CEO.

The first Cook Out location opened on Randleman Road in Greensboro, North Carolina, in 1989. Over 50 more locations opened in North Carolina before expanding out of the state. As of September 2026, over 300 locations are operating in ten states.

The company opened its first out-of-state store in Spartanburg, South Carolina, on July 30, 2010. Cook Out opened in Clemson and Orangeburg, South Carolina, in 2010. At the end of 2011, Cook Out opened restaurants in Columbia, South Carolina; Blacksburg, Virginia; and Radford, Virginia. In March 2012, Cook Out opened its first location in Lynchburg, Virginia, and shortly thereafter in Harrisonburg, Virginia. In October 2012, Cook Out opened a restaurant in Danville, Virginia. 2013 saw new Cook Out locations in Georgia, and in 2014, there were plans to launch several more Georgia locations, including its first Atlanta restaurant. In 2016, Cook Out expanded into Mississippi with stores in Oxford, Jackson, Hattiesburg, and Starkville, and the company's first Alabama location, in Tuscaloosa. Other locations in Alabama include Jacksonville (July 2017), Auburn (December 2017), Huntsville (January 2018), Opelika (May 2018), Troy (June 2018), Mobile (December 2018), Montgomery (January 2019) and Birmingham (January 2021). In 2018, Cook Out expanded its Virginia locations in the Collinsville community of Martinsville, Virginia which opened in September 2019. In November 2022, Cook Out opened a restaurant in Manassas Park, Virginia. In January 2024, Cookout opened a store in Newberry, South Carolina. On August 5, 2024, it was announced Cook Out would be adding and opening new restaurants in Charlotte, North Carolina. On July 9, 2025, Cookout opened a restaurant in Pensacola, Florida, making it the chain's first Florida location. Two additional Florida restaurants are planned to open in Tampa, Florida.

== Menu ==
Their menu primarily features grilled hamburgers and cheeseburgers, hot dogs, chicken sandwiches, chicken nuggets, chicken fingers, North Carolina barbecue and quesadillas.

Cook Out is noted for its value-oriented "Cook Out Tray", which allows customers to choose one main item, such as a burger, barbecue sandwich, or chicken tenders, paired with two sides and a beverage. Some locations allow a milkshake to be substituted for the beverage for an additional charge. The tray was described in 2024 as "one of the best fast food deals you’ll find" by Zoe Denenberg, writing for Southern Living.

The chain is also recognized for its wide variety of milkshake flavors, with more than 40 options available. Customers often combine flavors, creating thousands of possible variations. Cook Out’s milkshakes are frequently described as a hallmark of the brand.

Some flavors are offered on a seasonal basis, such as the watermelon milkshake, which is typically available in the summer months. The return of this item has been covered in local and national media outlets due to its popularity.

== Sponsorships ==
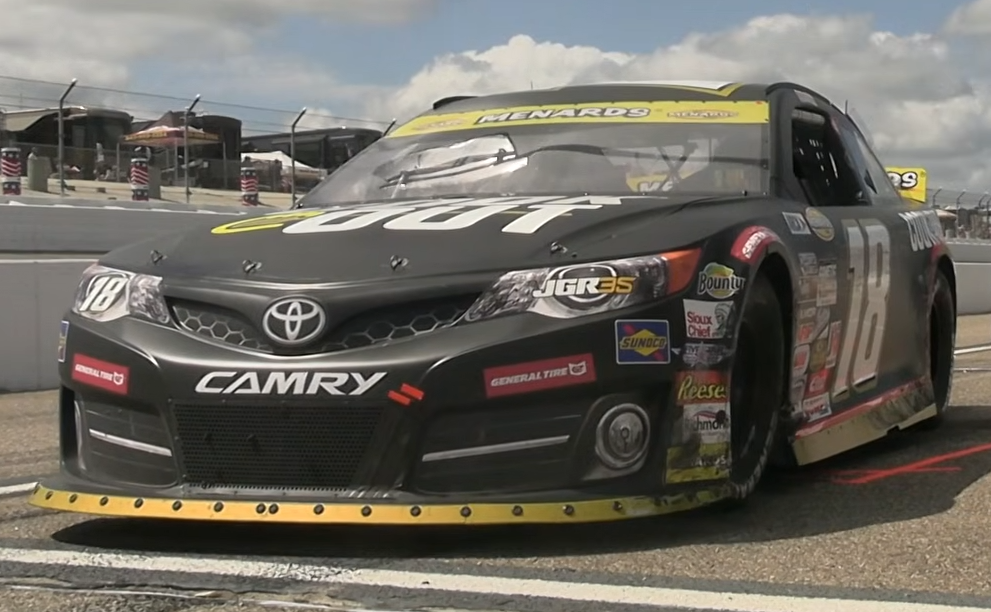
Max Reaves' Cook Out sponsored car at Rockingham in 2026.

Since 2020, Cook Out has sponsored the Southern 500 at Darlington Raceway, annually held on Labor Day since 1950, in addition, Cook Out has also sponsored the race at Richmond Raceway since 2023. and the Spring Race held at Martinsville Speedway since 2024 for the NASCAR Cup Series. In January 2025, they announced that they would be sponsoring both the Clash and the Madhouse Classic races at Bowman Gray Stadium. Max Reaves, the grandson of founder Morris Reaves and son of current CEO, Jeremy Reaves, also competes part-time in the ARCA Menards Series and the ARCA Menards Series East, driving the No. 18 Toyota Camry for Joe Gibbs Racing.
