= Barbecue in South Carolina =

Regional style of food preparation in the United States

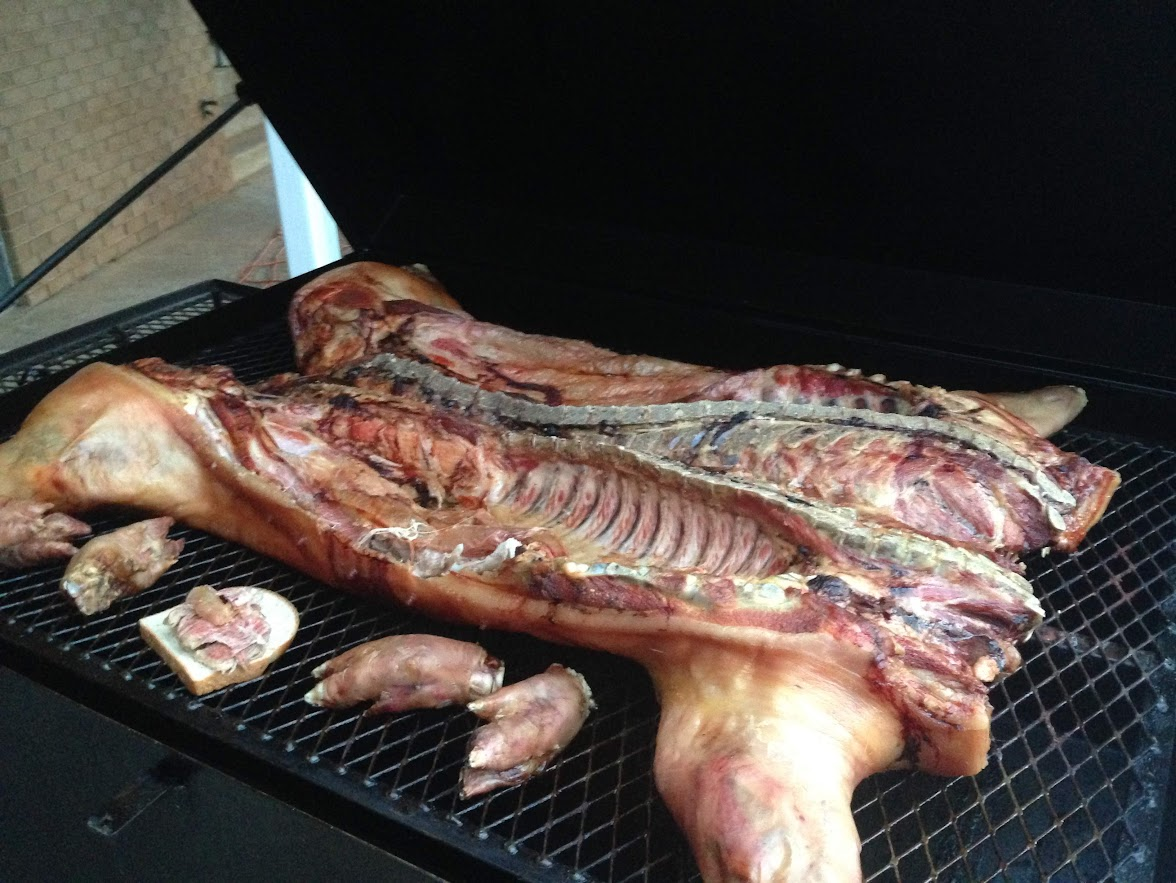
South Carolina Whole Hog BBQ

South Carolina is home to several distinct styles of barbecue characterized by different cuts of meat, types of barbecue sauce and preparation. It is particularly well known for the heavy emphasis on pork and the popularity of a mustard-based barbecue sauce in the central part of the state.

== History ==
Barbecue has its origins in the barbacoa style of cooking roasted meats that was enjoyed by indigenous peoples and Spanish colonists in the Caribbean, who settled the Carolinas. The earliest references to "barbeque" gatherings in South Carolina describe upperclass gatherings held by plantation owners, which featured roasted meats and drinking. Barbecue vendors and restaurants became common in South Carolina around the 1920s, often offering delivery to homes and events.

It is considered to be a part of Lowcountry cuisine. South Carolina barbecue has changed in the early 21st century, as the mustard sauce developed in the central Midlands of South Carolina has become more popular throughout the state. Beef has also become more common than in the past.

== Regional styles of barbecue ==
South Carolina is typically described as having four or five primary regions of barbecue typified by different sauces. This division of the state's barbecue regions was first coined by Charles F. Kovacik and John J. Winberry in their book South Carolina: A Geography (1987). This is sometimes simplified into three regions based on mustard, vinegar or tomato. Food historian Robert F. Moss has claimed that South Carolina really has only two regional barbecue sauces, sweet mustard and spicy vinegar.

Barbecue in South Carolina is typically prepared by smoking meat over hickory or oak. Barbecue in South Carolina heavily features pork rather than beef. Whole hog barbecue, where an entire pig is cooked over hardwood coals, is particularly common in the Pee Dee region of South Carolina. The pig is sometimes skinned prior to cooking and the skin is fried. Smoked pork shoulder is another distinctive style of barbecue associated with the state, as is pork butt and ham.

=== Mustard ===
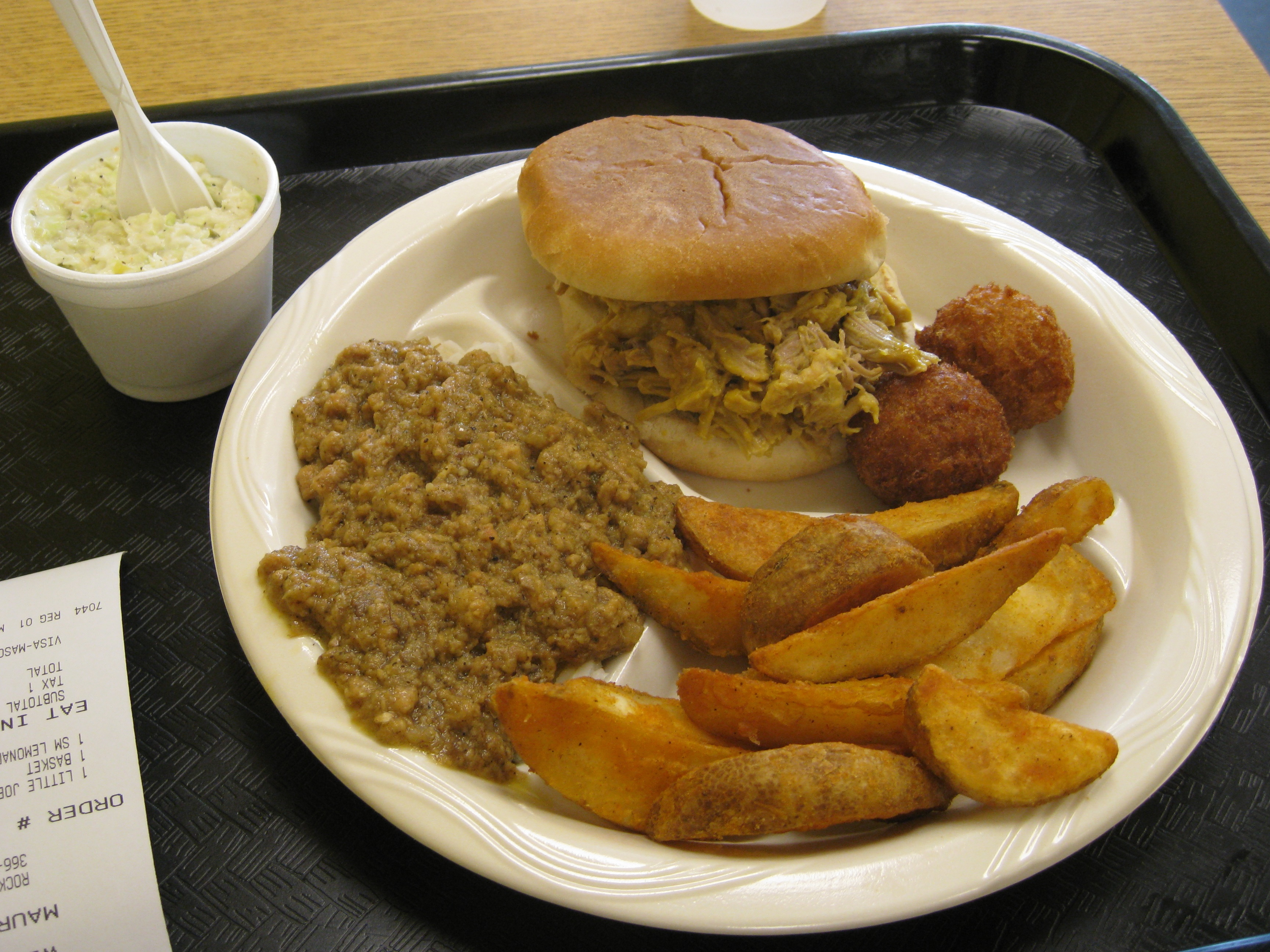
Plate of barbecue with mustard sauce. (Pictured from left to right) Hash, pulled pork sandwich, hushpuppies and potato wedges.

Mustard-based barbecue sauce is common in the central part of South Carolina, and this style of barbecue is most strongly associated with South Carolina. It is sometimes called "Carolina Gold". It may have originated in the French and German immigrant community that arrived in South Carolina in the 18th century. It has been linked to the "Mustard Belt" between Orangeburg County and Newberry County, where large numbers of German immigrants settled. Mustard was also thought to repel mosquitoes in colonial times, preventing malaria.

Families such as the Dukes (of Dukes Bar-B-Que) and Bessingers opened up restaurant chains in Orangeburg during the mid 20th century, establishing that style of barbecue in the region. Some accounts have attributed the invention of mustard sauce to Joe Bessinger, father of white supremacist and segregationist Maurice Bessinger. Maurice Bessinger played a major role in popularizing mustard sauce, and sold bottled mustard-based sauce in national supermarkets during the 1990s. He had the largest barbecue business in the United States by 1999, until his insistence on using the Confederate flag on packaging and distributing racist literature in his restaurants caused his sales to decline.

In some parts of Orangeburg, a "rust sauce" that includes both ketchup and mustard is served.

=== Vinegar and pepper ===
A barbecue sauce made of vinegar, salt and pepper is frequently served in the Pee Dee region, and is heavily based upon Native American sauces used to baste meats. This style of sauce is virtually identical to the vinegar sauce used in Eastern North Carolina barbecue.

=== Light tomato ===
Light tomato barbecue sauce, which is a thin vinegar and ketchup-based sauce, is common in Upstate South Carolina, due to the influence of North Carolina barbecue. It is believed to have originated due to the affordability of mass produced ketchup in the early 20th century. It often includes cayenne pepper or hot sauce.

=== Heavy tomato ===
Heavy tomato sauce, more similar to sauces popular in other states, is common in Western South Carolina. It often includes molasses and brown sugar, making it sweeter than other types of South Carolina barbecue.

== Dishes ==
South Carolina is known for "hash", a pork, offal and onion-based stew or gravy. In the upstate region of South Carolina, hash instead refers to a pork and beef stew.

== See also ==
- Barbecue in North Carolina
