= Red slaw =

Condiment

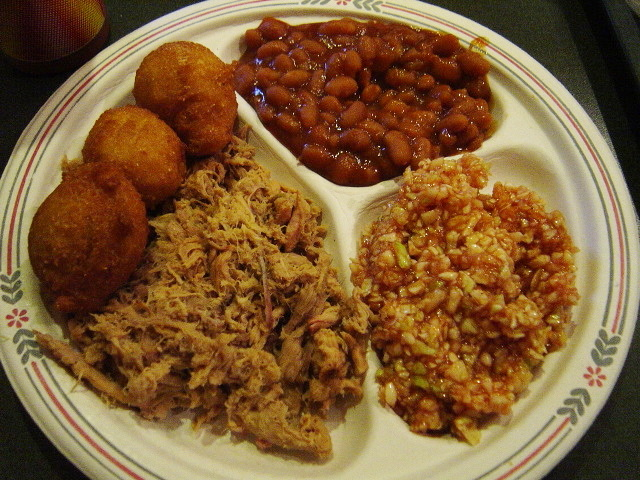
- Lexington (North Carolina) style barbecue (pulled pork) served with hushpuppies, baked beans and red slaw (lower right)
- Alternative names: Barbecue slaw
- Type: Condiment
- Place of origin: United States
- Region or state: North Carolina
- Main ingredients: Cabbage, vinegar, ketchup
- Variations: Barbecue sauce

Red slaw (sometimes called barbecue slaw) is a condiment commonly served on hot dogs, on barbecue pork sandwiches, as a side dish for other types of barbecue, on hamburgers, or with other foods. It is an essential part of "Lexington style" North Carolina barbecue.

== Description ==
Red slaw is different from traditional coleslaw in that it does not use mayonnaise as an ingredient, allowing it to be stored for longer periods without refrigeration and making it more suitable for outdoor serving.

It is made with green cabbage, vinegar, water and ketchup, and a variety of spices and seasoning. The ketchup gives it the characteristic color. In addition to being a staple part of Lexington style barbecue, it is also common in other portions of the Southeastern United States. In these regions, regular cole slaw may be called "white slaw" to differentiate it from red slaw.

Recipes vary widely and may include other ingredients, such as onion, sugar, black pepper, mustard seed and other spices, depending on the region in which it is being served.

In the late 1990s, Wendy's sold the "Carolina Classic Burger" which was a traditional hamburger with red slaw, onions, chili and American cheese, going so far as to trademark the name.

== See also ==
- List of cabbage dishes
