= Lexington Barbecue Festival =

Annual festival in Lexington, North Carolina

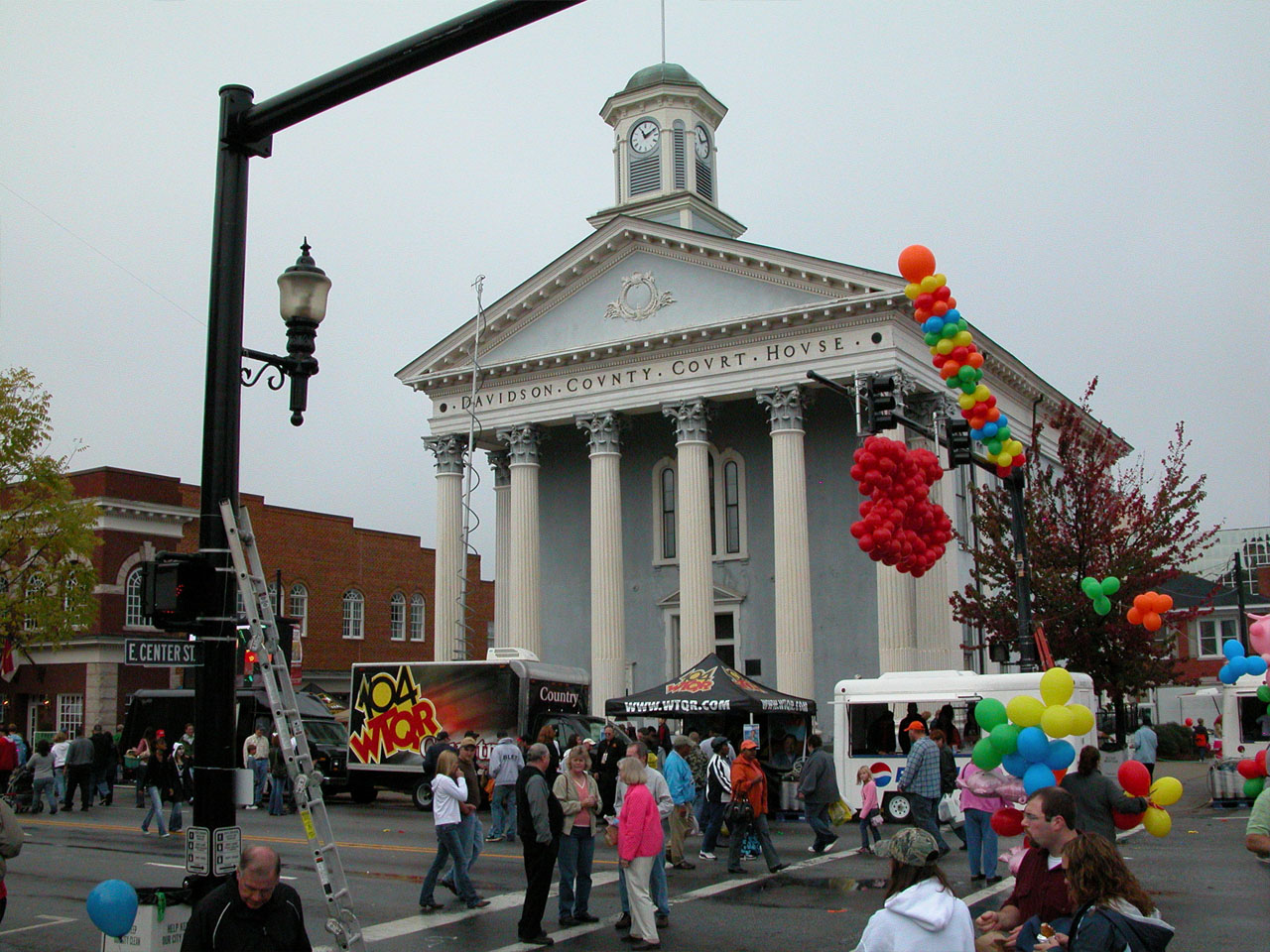
Corner of Main & Center streets during the festival

The Lexington Barbecue Festival is a one-day food festival held each October in Lexington, North Carolina, the "Barbecue Capital of the World." Each year it attracts as many as 200,000 visitors to the uptown Lexington area to sample the different foods from up to 20 different area restaurants, dozens of visiting food vendors, and hundreds of other vendors.

The annual event is listed in the book 1000 Places to See in the USA & Canada Before-You-Die, a part of the series based on the best-selling 1,000 Places to See Before You Die. In 2012, the U.S. News & World Report ranked Lexington as #4 on its list of the best cities for barbecue.

The 2026 festival is planned to be held on October 24.

== History ==
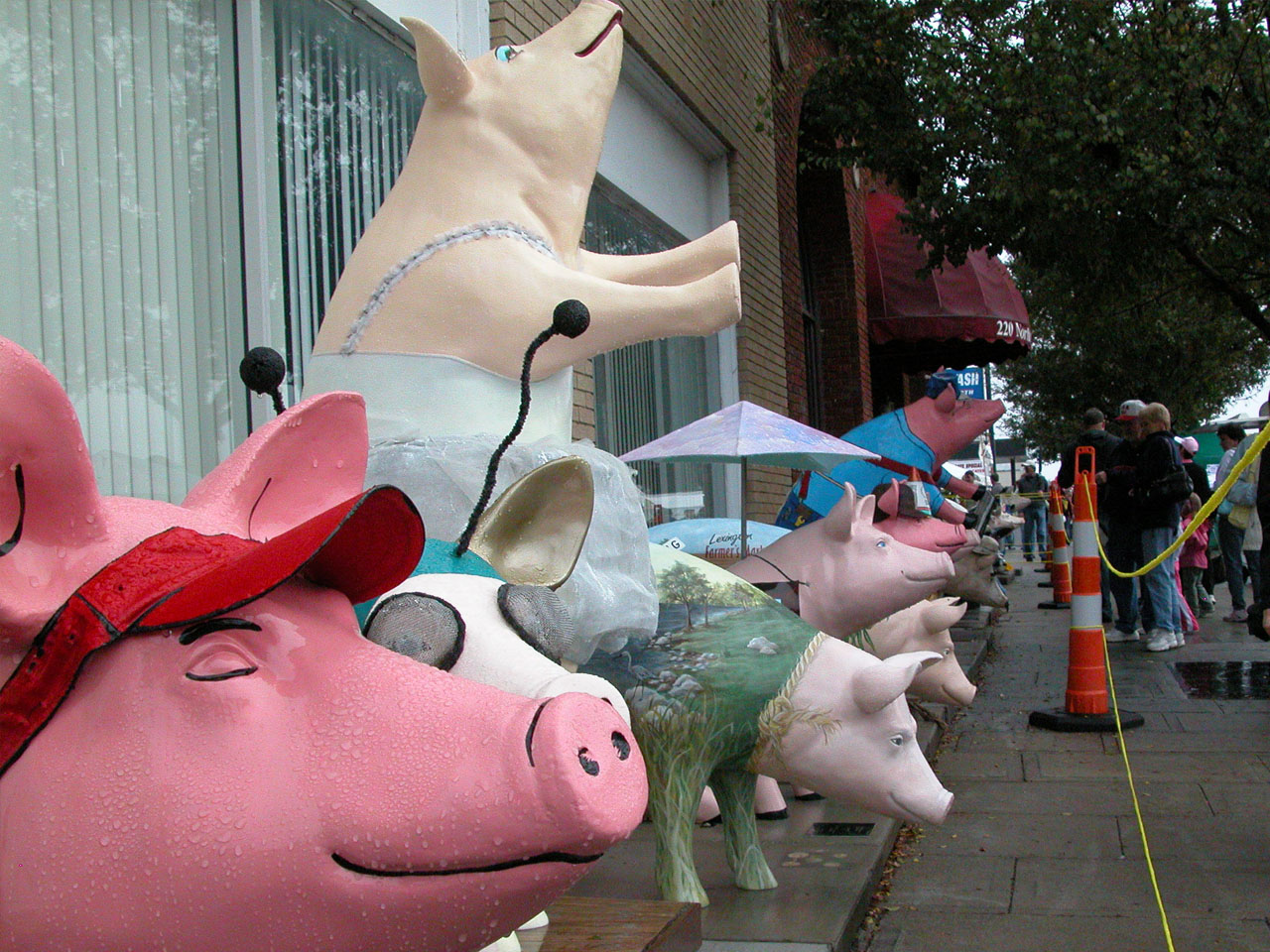
The festival includes the Pigs in the City event

The idea for an annual festival was first brought up in 1983 by Joe Sink, Jr., publisher of Lexington's daily newspaper, The Dispatch. He approached the bank BB&T, which agreed to look into the idea and hired Kay Saintsing, a local organization developer and manager, to conduct a study of the feasibility of such a festival. The investigation concluded that the festival was a valid idea, as Lexington was already a popular weekend destination for barbecue, and the first festival was held October 27, 1984.

The Lexington Barbecue Festival was to become one of the nation's most popular food festivals. The first festival attracted 30,000 people, and the barbecue chefs cooked 3,000 pounds of barbecue to meet demand; by 1994, attendance had risen to over 100,000, and 11,000 pounds of meat were cooked. In 1995, the North Carolina Championship Pork Cook-Off was held in conjunction with the festival, allowing visitors from the Piedmont to watch whole-hog cooking experts from the eastern part of the state demonstrate their methods.

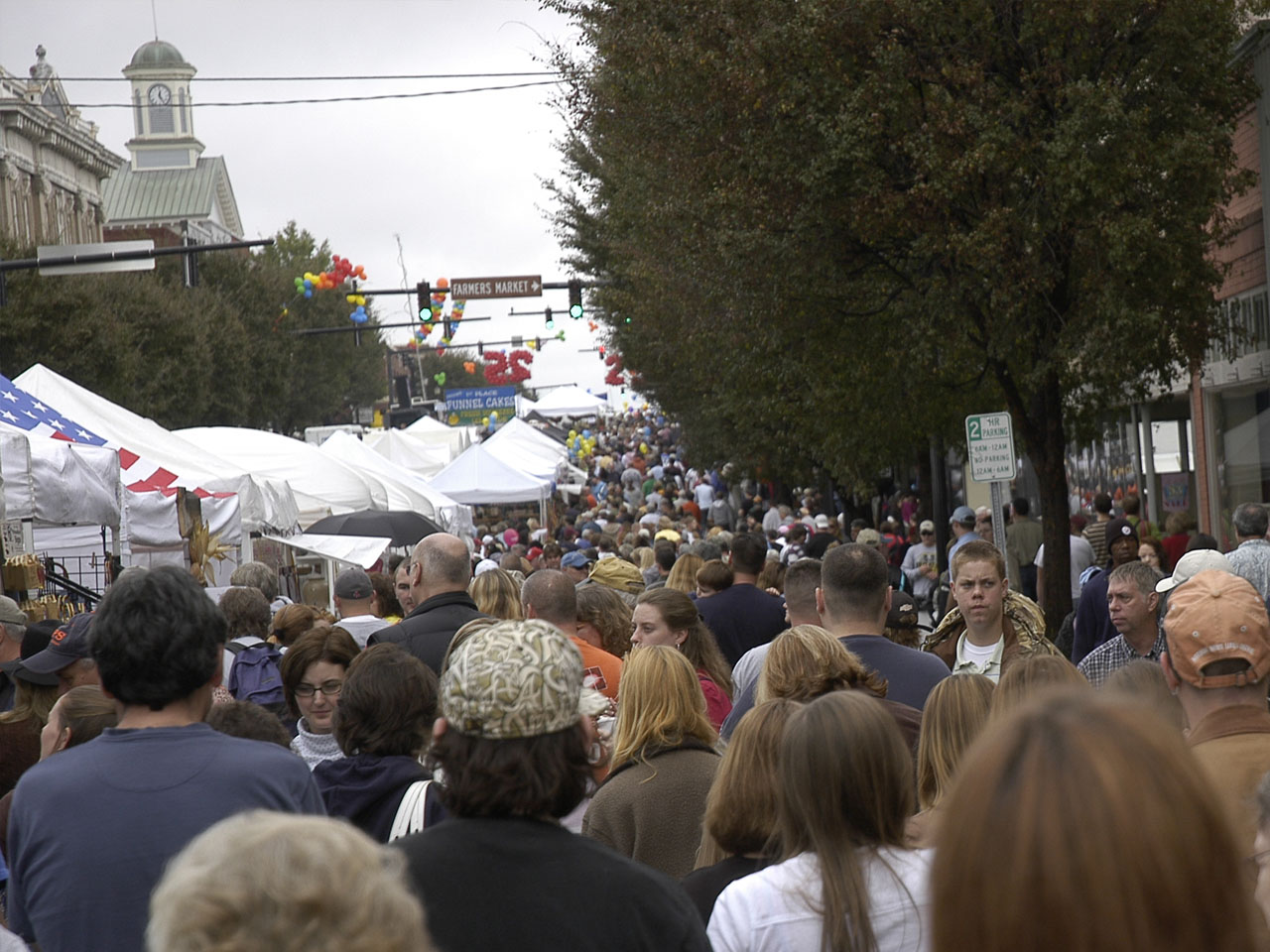
Downtown during the festival

The festival is held each October in uptown Lexington. Several city blocks on main street, are closed to vehicle traffic for the event. Besides barbecue, there are typically over 400 other vendors of arts and crafts, homemade fudge and other wares. Over the years, sponsors have included Childress Vineyards, Pepsi, BB&T, Walmart, and other large and local corporations.

When the festival first started in 1984, the participants were primarily local restaurants and a few local merchants. Since then it has grown to hundreds of vendors displaying every type of product. While the primary focus is still the barbecue, a large number of merchants sell other items that are unique to the area.

The festival went virtual in 2020.

== Amtrak station ==
During the festival, NC By Train establishes a temporary train station a block away, which is served by Amtrak's Carolinian and Piedmont.

== "Pork-Barrel Politics" ==
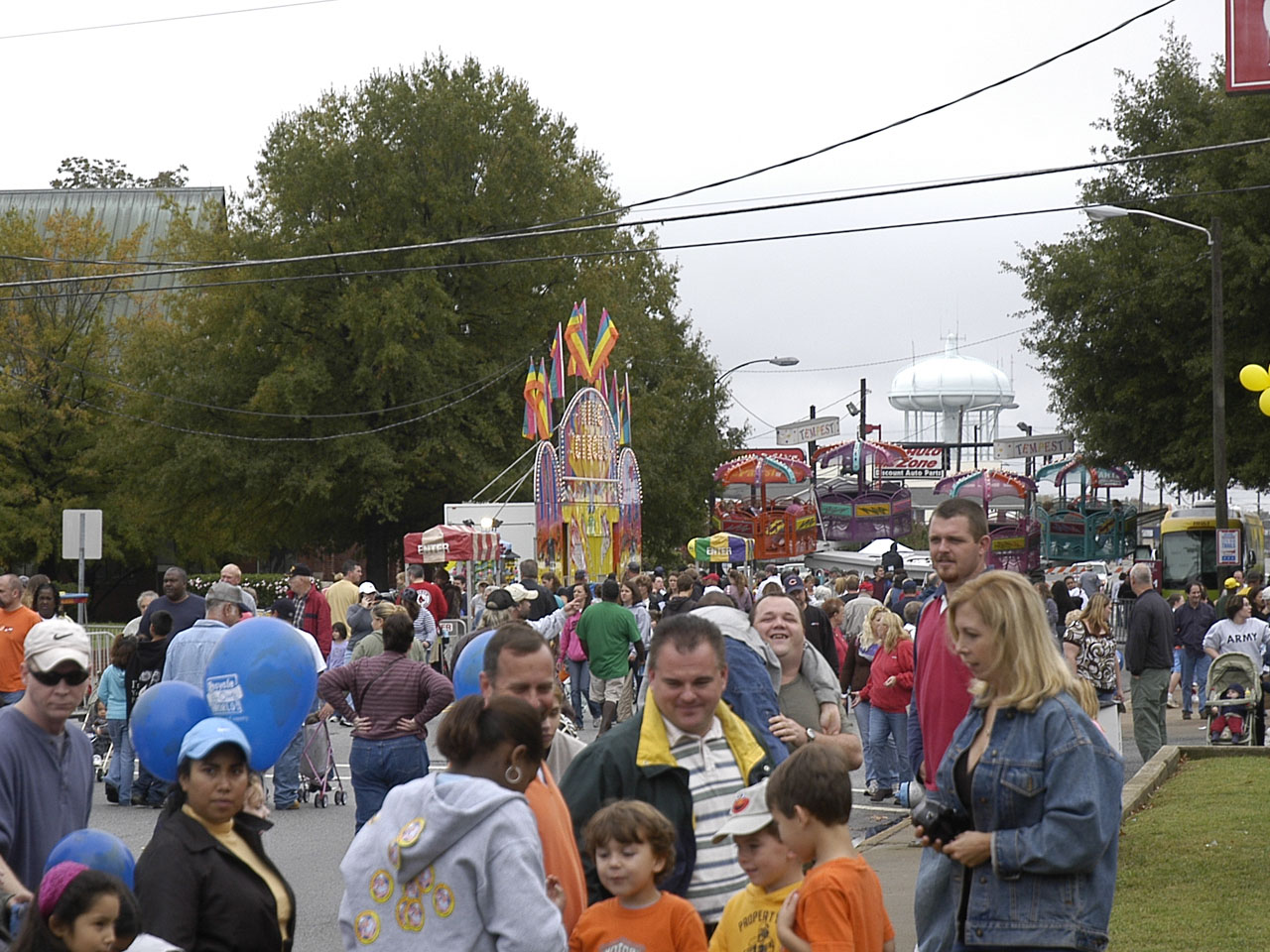
Some of the rides at the festival

While the focus of the festival is Lexington style barbecue, several vendors of the eastern variety can also be found, sparking mild (and sometimes not so mild) controversy. The battle of Lexington style vs. eastern style has even gone as far as the state government. In 2006, North Carolina House Bill 21 and North Carolina Senate Bill 47 were introduced and would have made the Lexington Barbecue Festival the official barbecue festival of North Carolina. A separate amended bill, North Carolina House Bill suggested making the Lexington Barbecue Festival the official food festival of North Carolina. Neither garnered enough support to pass, as nearly half of the state favors the eastern style barbecue, sparking genuine controversy about the bill incidentally creating an "official state barbecue" (as opposed to just the festival) with either Lexington or eastern style.

One example of the more light-hearted feud that exists between the proponents of the two types of barbecue is when author Jerry Bledsoe, the self-professed "world's leading, foremost barbecue authority." claimed that Dennis Rogers, (columnist for The Raleigh News & Observer and self-professed "oracle of the holy grub.") "has ruined any chances of this state being distinguished in its barbecue." While a degree of humor is involved, choice of barbecue type is a politically charged topic.

=== Official status ===
In 2007, NC House Bill 433 passed, granting the Lexington Barbecue Festival the title "Official Food Festival of the Piedmont Triad Region of the State of North Carolina". By excluding the eastern part of the state when making an official designation, they effectively bypassed any controversy regarding eastern barbecue and avoided any style of barbecue being considered the "official" barbecue for the State of North Carolina.

== Other activities ==
Some of the other activities include lumberlack games, live music from up to five different stages, and street performers.

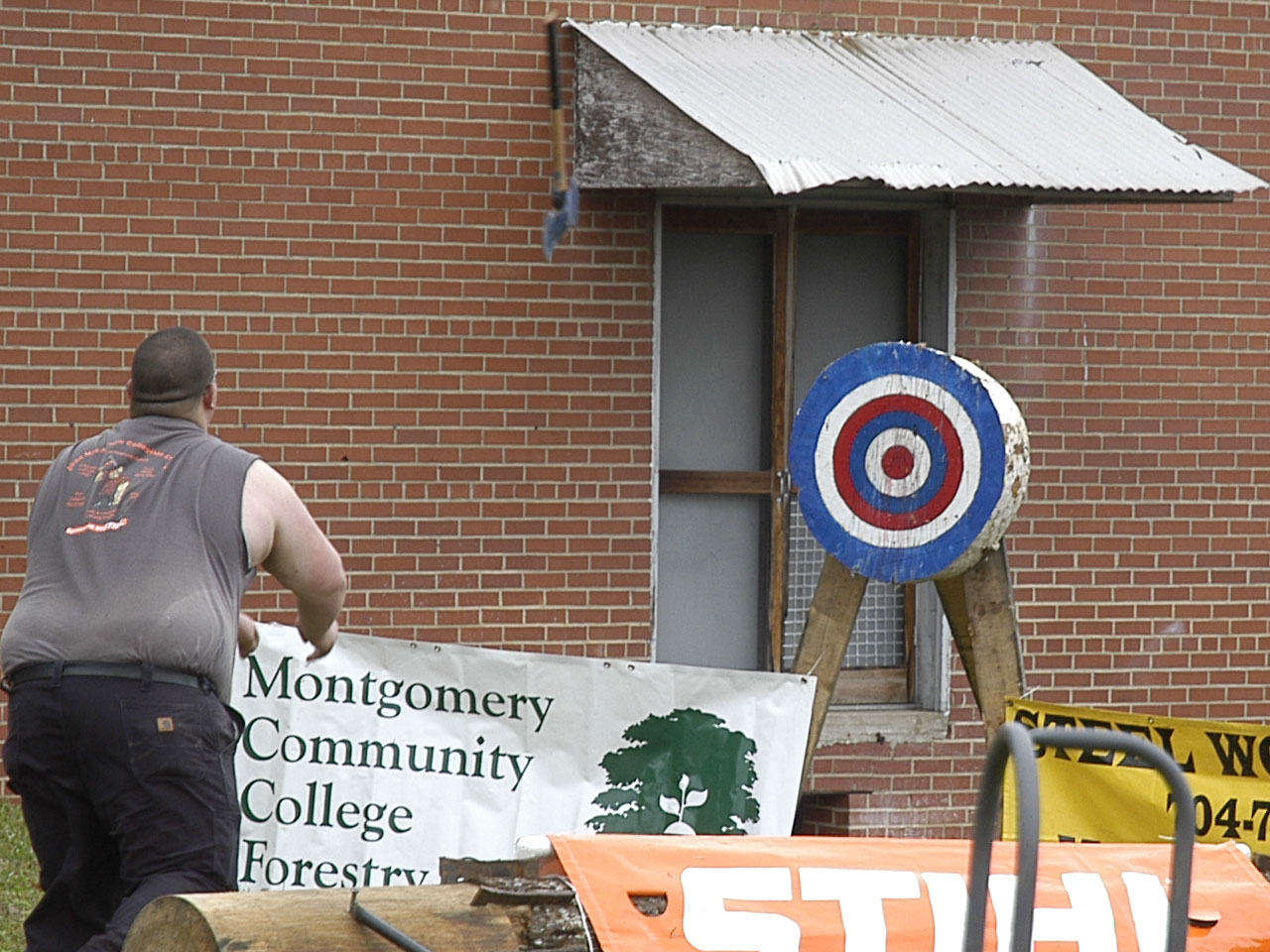
Axe throwing contest

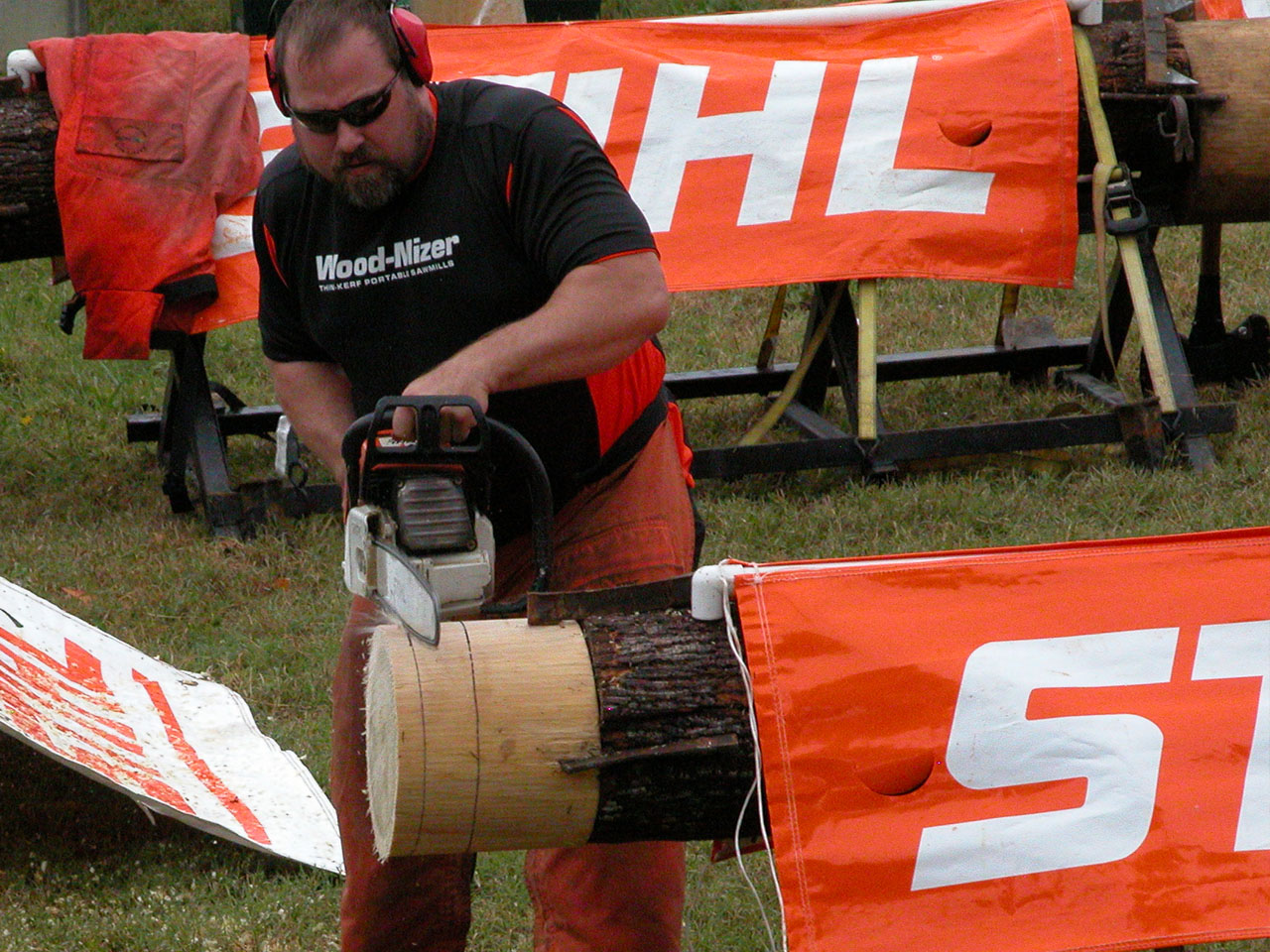
Fastest double cut chainsaw contest

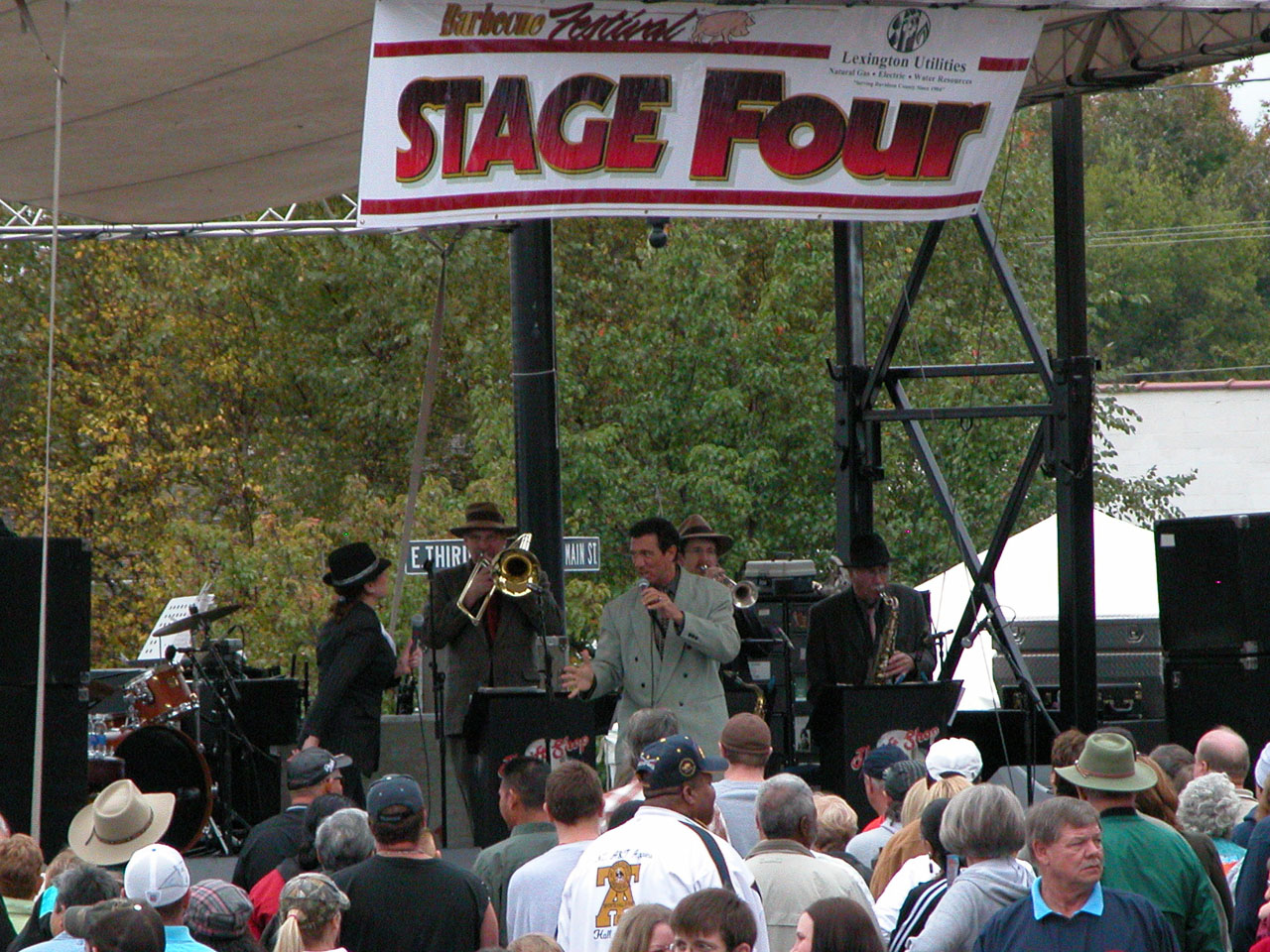
Swing music

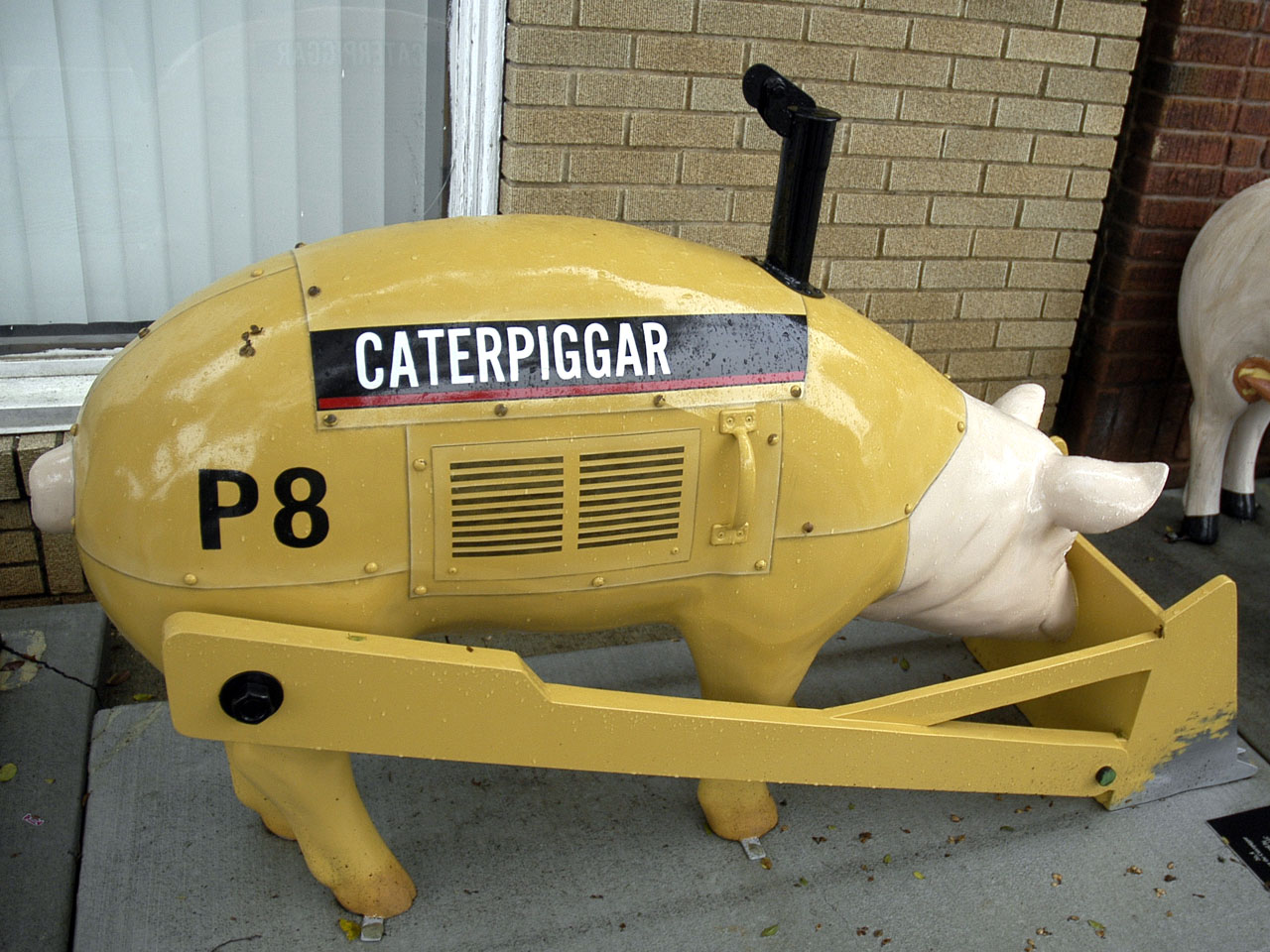
One of dozens of pigs on parade

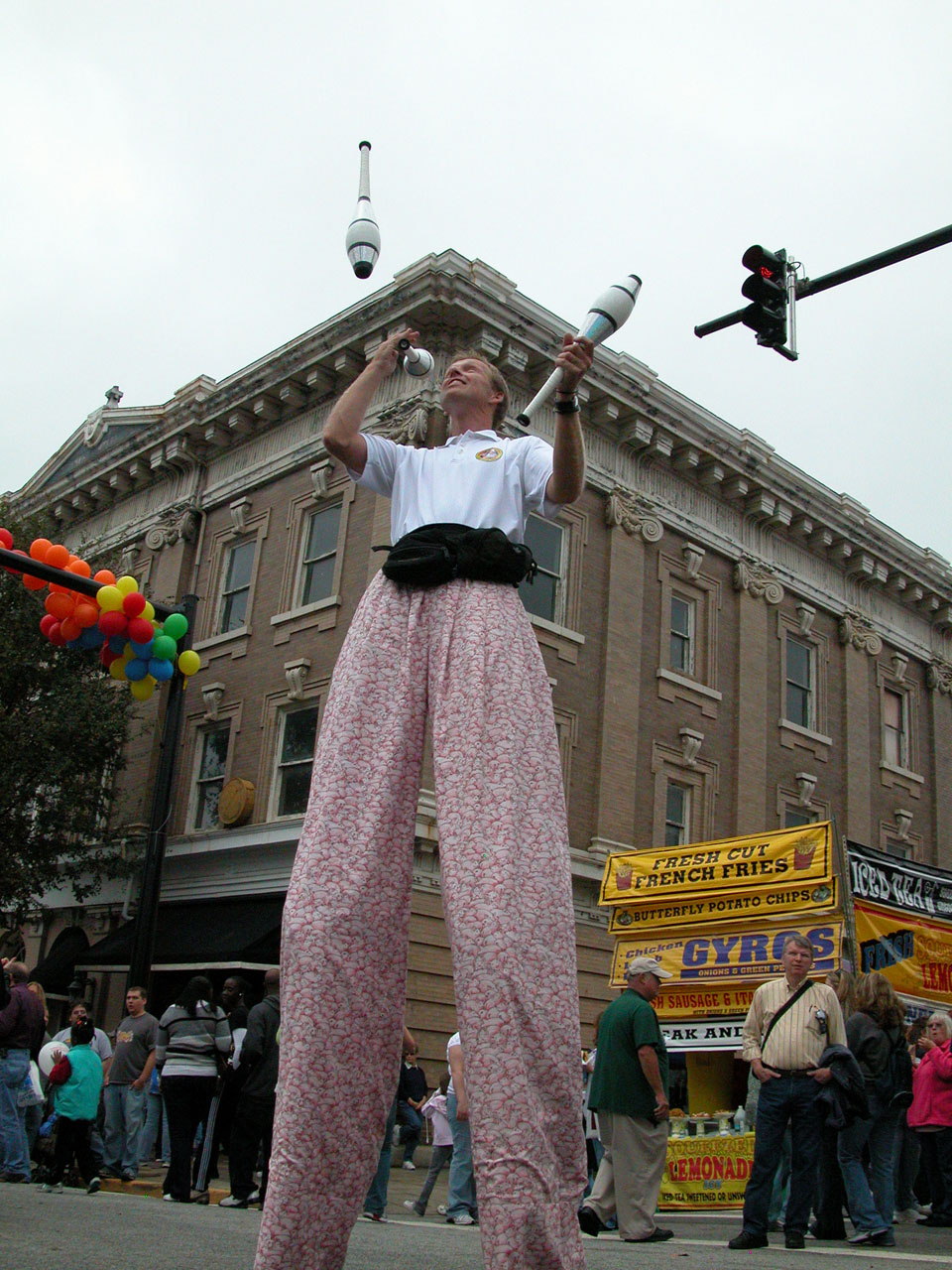
Acrobatics performed on the street

Pig-related souvenirs and balloons

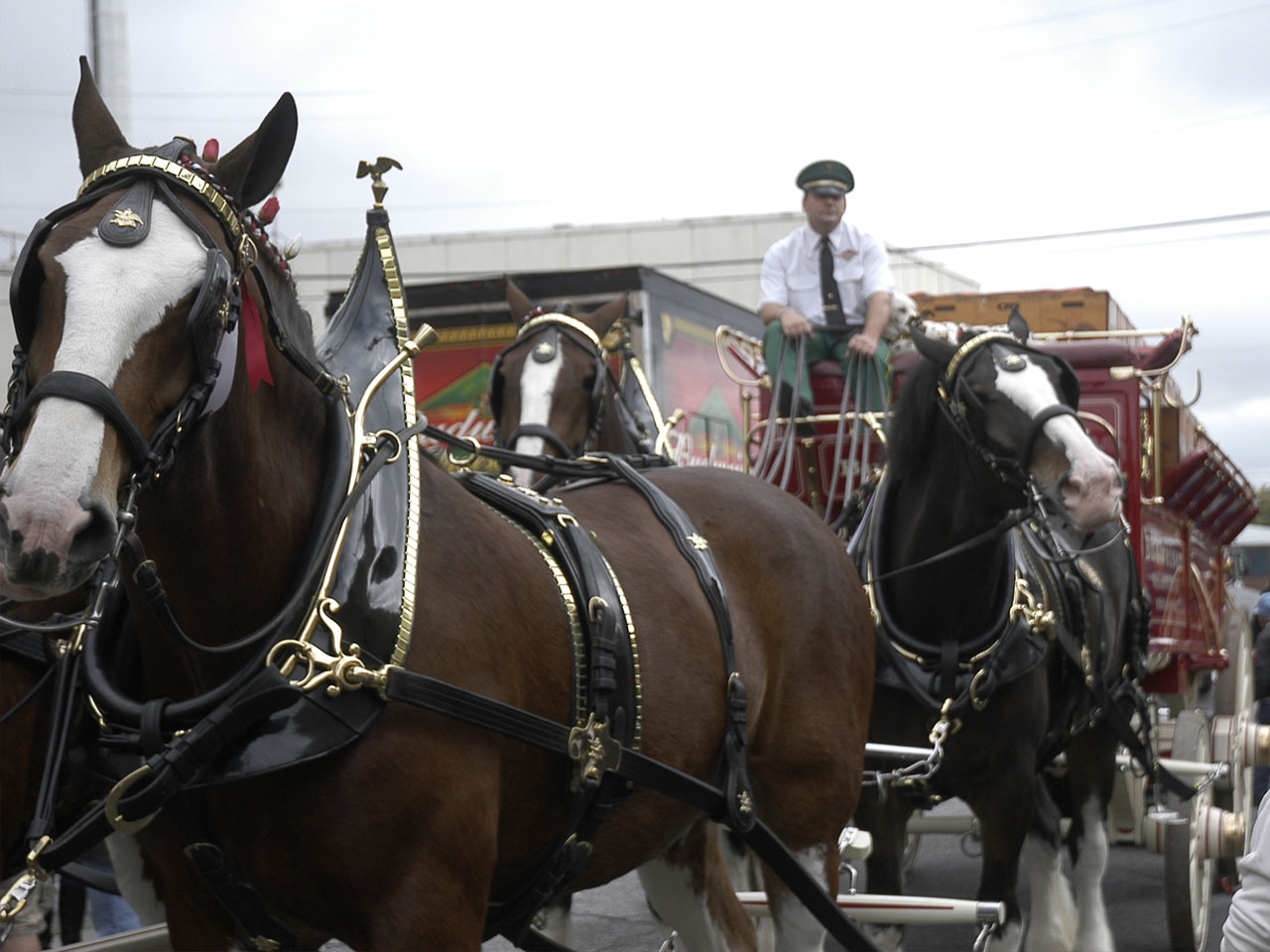
Budweiser Clydesdales

== See also ==
- Pigs in the City
- North Carolina Barbecue Society
- Barbecue in North Carolina
- List of North Carolina-related topics
- Lexington station (North Carolina)
- List of festivals in North Carolina
