= Whole hog barbecue =

Style of pit barbecue

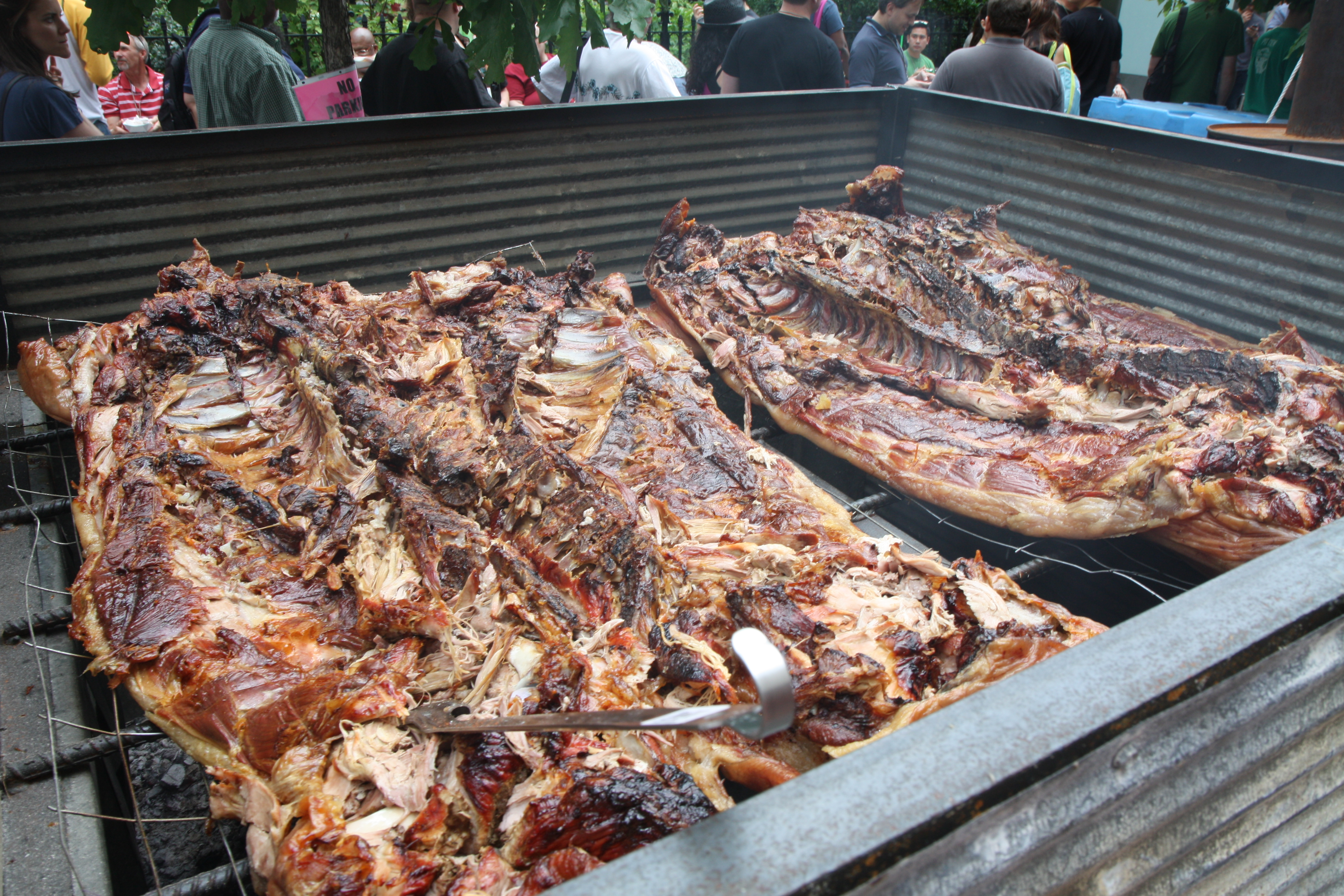
- Hogs smoking skin-side down in a steel pit.
- Type: Barbecue
- Course: Main course
- Region or state: Southern United States
- Associated cuisine: United States barbecue
- Serving temperature: Hot
- Main ingredients: Pig

Whole hog barbecue is a style of pit barbecue from the United States. It is prepared by splitting open the dressed carcass of a pig and cooking it over charcoals in a barbecue pit. The cooked meat is chopped up and coated in barbecue sauce. It is commonly served with sides such as cornbread or as a barbecue sandwich.

This type of barbecue is part of the cuisine of the Southern United States, where it has historically been a common feature of social gatherings and celebrations. It is especially associated with the Carolinas, Tennessee and Arkansas.

The popularity of whole hog barbecue has declined in the 21st century due to the amount of time, labor, and fuel involved in its preparation. Additionally, the decreasing number of independent farms has made it difficult for restaurant owners to source whole pigs, as corporate farms typically distribute only butchered cuts of meat. Other methods of barbecue, that involve smaller cuts of meat and less complex preparation, have become more common.

== History ==
=== Origin ===
Food historian Robert F. Moss notes that by the 18th century, the ritualized barbecue of whole hogs was firmly established in the British colonies, later becoming a part of the culture of the United States. The practice of large communal barbecues involving the consumption of whole pigs or sheep spread from the Colony of Virginia into North and South Carolina in the mid-18th century. Barbecue parties, at which whole hogs were cooked, were commonly held for fundraisers, church gatherings, and political rallies in the Carolina and Virginia colonies. The Oxford Encyclopedia of Food and Drink in America designates whole hog barbecue as the oldest style of open pit barbecue in the United States.

=== Modern ===
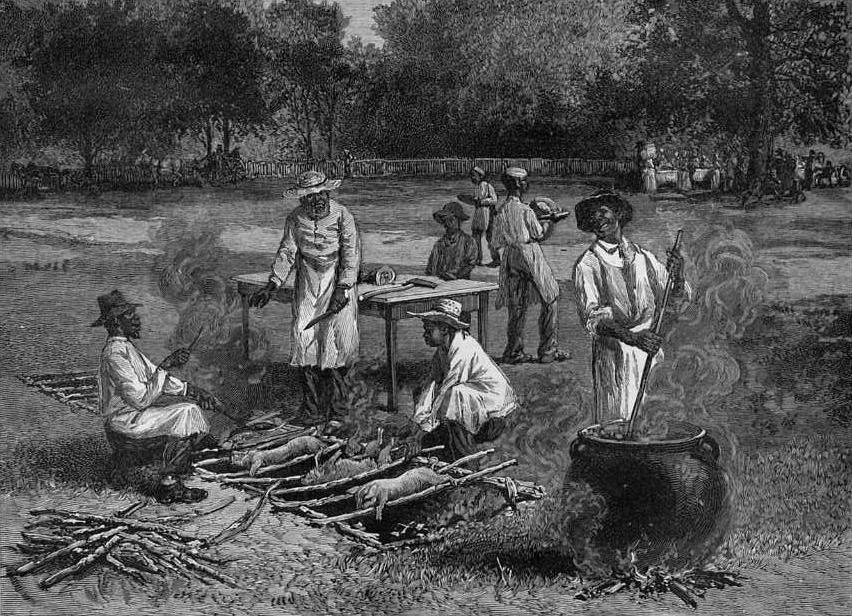
A Southern Barbecue, a wood engraving published in Harper's Weekly in 1887.

Barbecues are an important social and cultural tradition in the Southern United States, and whole hog barbecues have traditionally been held to celebrate events like the autumn harvest or American Independence Day. Accordingly, cooks who prepare whole hogs often become prominent in their local communities. Whole hog barbecues were once customarily held as part of large community and family gatherings, although this has become less common in the 21st century. This method of barbecuing remains popular in cooking competitions.

Barbecue restaurants serving whole hog barbecue are primarily found in North Carolina, South Carolina, West Tennessee, and Arkansas, although they may also be found in Georgia, Alabama, and Mississippi. In most other parts of the Southern United States, barbecue typically involves individual cuts of meat like ribs and pork butt. The first dine-in whole hog barbecue restaurant was Melton's Barbecue, which opened in Rocky Mount, North Carolina in 1924. Historically, many Southern whole hog barbecue restaurants were owned by white restaurateurs and employed white waitstaff, while employing black cooks and kitchen staff. Most new whole hog barbecue restaurants are founded by cooks who were trained at older establishments, enabling the transmission of barbecue techniques between generations.

In 2017, Daniel Vaughn of Texas Monthly reported that the number of restaurants in the United States that served whole hog barbecue was declining. Vaughn attributed this decline to the difficulty of preparing whole hog barbecue and the fact that meat suppliers increasingly distributed only butchered meat instead of whole pigs. During the 1980s, the independent pig farms that supplied whole pigs to restaurants in Tennessee began to be replaced by larger corporate farms. These corporate farms primarily distribute butchered cuts like pork shoulders and hams instead of whole animals, which has made it difficult for barbecue restaurants to obtain whole pigs.

Many cooks and restaurants have also stopped preparing whole hog barbecue because it is more expensive to produce, requiring more labor and fuel than more modernized types of barbecue, while producing more soot. Additionally, much of the weight of a whole hog is bones and fat, which can not be sold and is therefore wasted. Cooks who continue to prepare whole hog barbecue often emphasize that their customers value the ritual preparation, uniqueness, and perceived quality associated with it. In rural West Tennessee, whole hog barbecue is considered to be more authentic and superior in quality to other styles of barbecue, such as Memphis-style barbecue. The preparation and consumption of whole hog barbecue is also a feature of local identity in many West Tennessee communities.

== Preparation ==
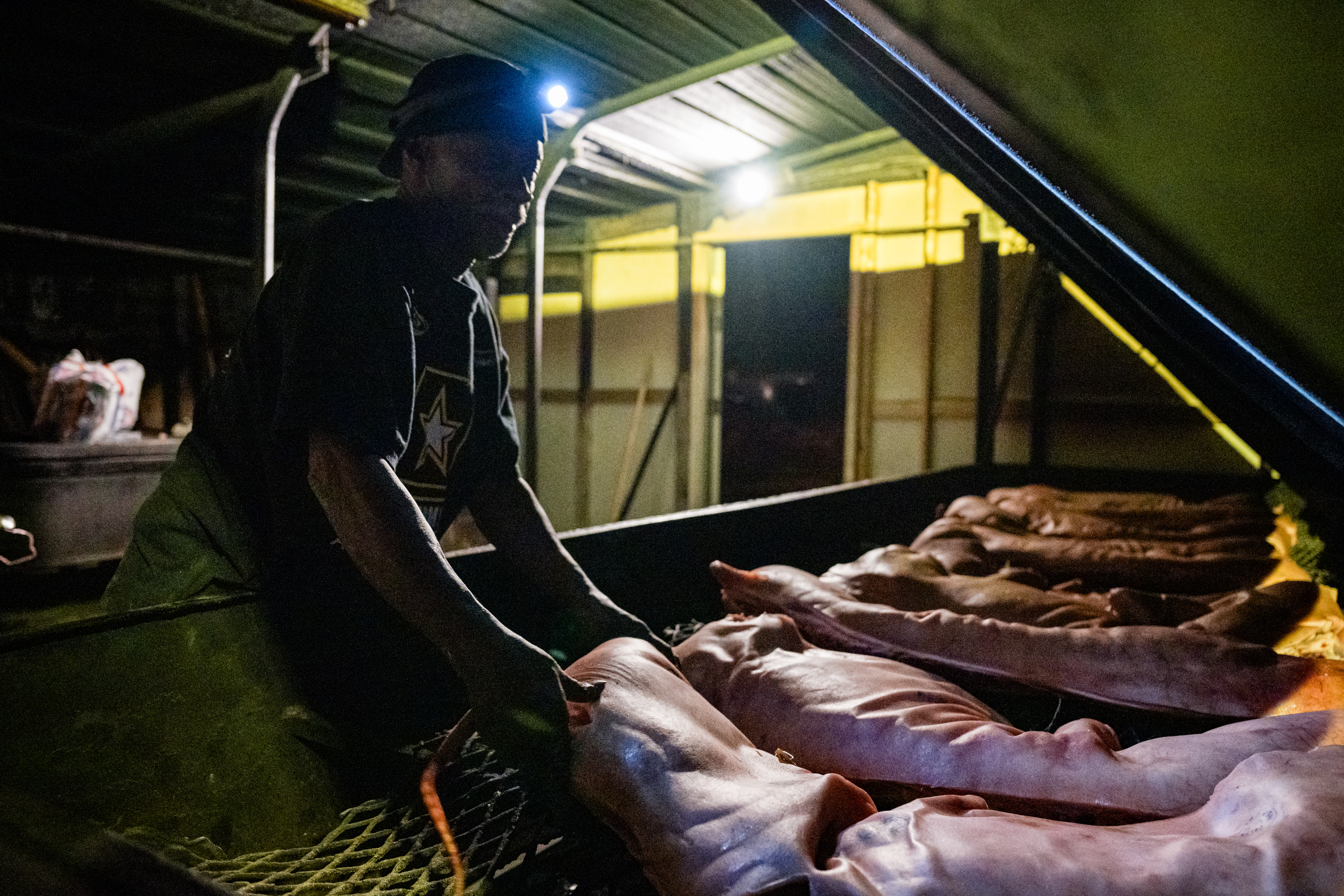
Hogs being placed on a barbecue pit in Greenville, North Carolina.

Whole hog barbecue involves slow-cooking an entire pig over a barbecue pit. The pit is either made by digging into the earth, or by building a wide, shallow container above the ground. Cinder blocks are often used to build such barbecue pits, although some pits are made out of other materials such as bricks or steel. The pit is filled with charcoal, which is traditionally made by burning wood in a nearby fireplace or a "burn barrel" made from a repurposed metal drum. Gas-fired pits are more commonly used by new barbecue restaurants, and many existing restaurants have switched to using gas as fuel instead of wood.

The hog is dressed or gralloched, meaning the internal organs and inedible parts are removed, and the carcass is split open. The split pig is placed on a rack over top of the barbecue pit. The backbone of the pig may be cracked and the head may be split open to ensure that its entire body lays flat. The meat is generally not basted or dressed in barbecue sauce while it is being cooked, although in some cases a dry rub may be used to season the meat before cooking.

The hogs used may weigh as much as 300 pounds (140 kg). In the Carolinas, small hogs are typically chosen and these are cooked at high temperatures, causing the skin to become crispy so that it can be chopped up and mixed into the pulled meat. The skin absorbs more flavor from the smoke than meat does and becomes crispy during cooking, imparting a smoky flavor and crunchy texture. In Tennessee, larger hogs are used and they are cooked at a lower temperature, which prevents their skin from becoming crisp.

While cooking, the fat melts into liquid and pools in the center of the hog. This causes the meat to cook in its own fat, which is similar to the process of making confit. Bacon hogs, breeds of pig with more muscle and less fat, are commonly used for whole hog barbecue. The most common breed is the American Yorkshire. Fattier breeds of hog can be dangerous, as the excess fat becomes a fire accelerant when it melts during the cooking process. A common hazard of whole hog barbecue is the possibility of an uncontrolled pit fire resulting from the melted fat. Fires can pose a danger to the cook and result in the destruction of the pit or surrounding building if not contained. However, hogs that are too lean become drier and less palatable when barbecued.

The hog is cooked skin-side up for the majority of the cooking process, before being flipped upside down to cook the skin. The hog is cooked until the meat is tender, which may take anywhere between 8 hours and 24 hours depending on the method of preparation. Whole hog barbecue is considered to be one of the most difficult and dangerous styles of barbecue to prepare. The process is time-consuming and a lot of technical skill is required to handle the heavy carcasses and large quantities of heat and smoke produced by the pit. The process of preparing the hogs, flipping them, and tending the flames typically requires multiple people.

== Serving ==
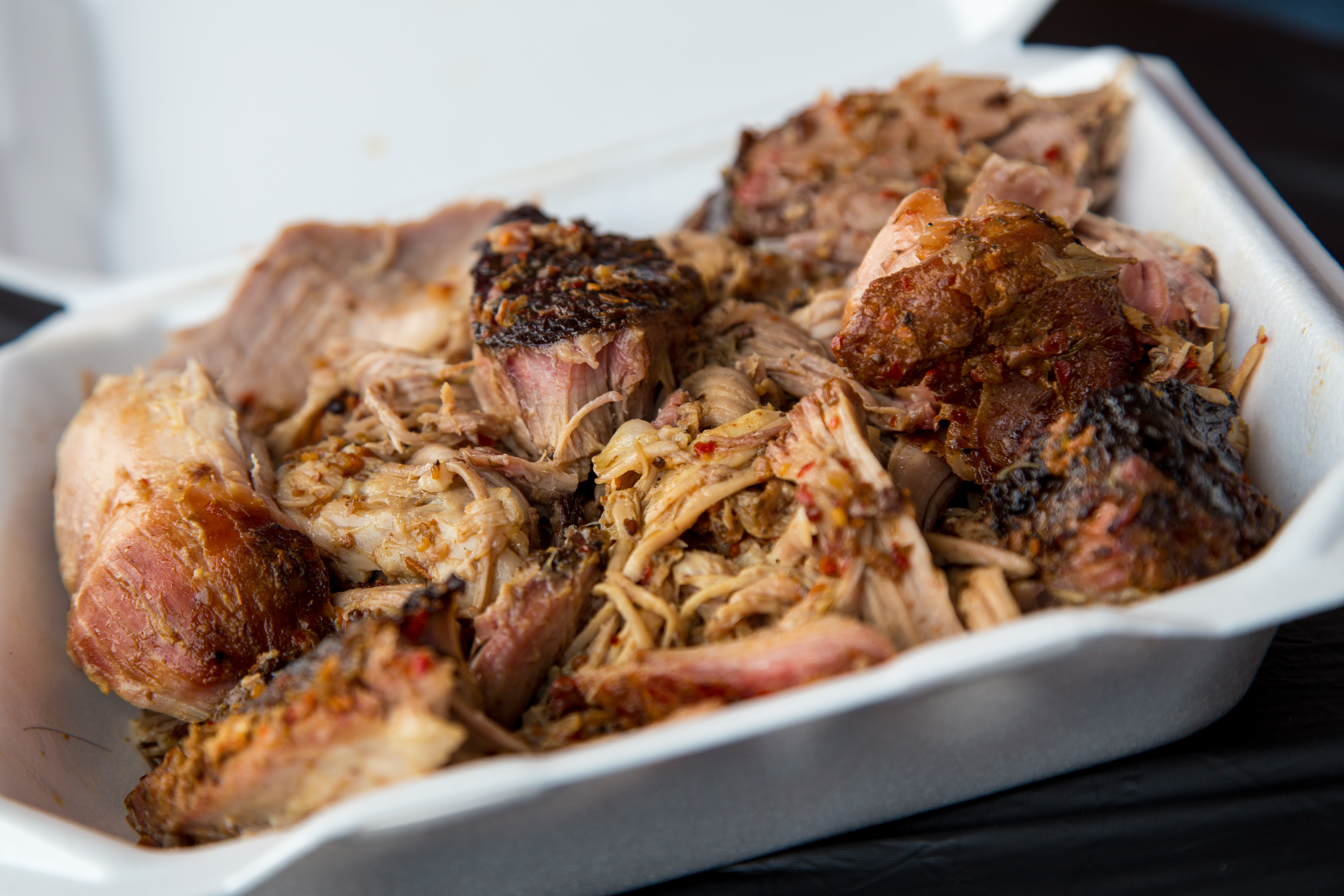
A container of chopped whole hog barbecue.

Once cooked, the meat is separated from the bone and either finely chopped or pulled into threads of pulled pork. American food writers Jane and Michael Stern wrote that the sound of meat being chopped with cleavers is "[o]ne of the most alluring aspects of whole hog barbecue in the Carolinas." Some restaurants mix all of the chopped meat together, while others allow customers to choose meat from a specific part of the hog. Customers may choose white meat, dark meat, or a combination of both types. Some parts of the pig are considered to be particularly desirable, such as the "middlin", taken from the underbelly of the pig. The "catfish", a section of meat from below the pork tenderloin, is considered especially tender.

Whole hog barbecue is described as having a moist, tender, and juicy texture, with a smoky taste. The meat is typically coated in a thin barbecue sauce made of vinegar and red pepper. Regional variations of this sauce are found in different states, including a mustard-based barbecue sauce in South Carolina and a tomato-based sauce in Georgia. Most restaurants and cooks use secret recipes for their sauce, which they may advertise as being uniquely sweet, spicy, or vinegary in comparison to other recipes.

Whole hog barbecue may be served as a main course accompanied by sides, typically cornbread or hushpuppies, a type of deep-fried cornmeal fritter. Sweet tea is commonly provided as an accompaniment. The meat may also be served on a white bread roll as a sandwich, topped with coleslaw. The tradition of using whole hog barbecue as the filling of a barbecue sandwich began in the 20th century. The liver and other organ meats left over from the hog is traditionally cooked into hash, a thick meat stew served over rice.

== See also ==
- Pig pickin', a similar barbecue involving grilling a whole hog
- Pig slaughter, the process and traditions around butchering pigs

== Sources ==
=== Books ===
- Deutsch, Jonathan; Elias, Megan J. (2014). Barbecue: A Global History. London: Reaktion Books. ISBN 1780232594.
- Egerton, John (1993) [1987]. Southern Food: At Home, on the Road, in History (2nd ed.). Chapel Hill, North Carolina: University of North Carolina Press. ISBN 0807844179.
- Fertel, Rien (2017). The One True Barbecue: Fire, Smoke, and the Pitmasters Who Cook the Whole Hog. New York City, New York: Simon and Schuster. ISBN 1476793980.
- Jones, Sam; Vaughn, Daniel (2019). Whole Hog BBQ: The Gospel of Carolina Barbecue with Recipes from Skylight Inn and Sam Jones BBQ. Berkeley, California: Clarkson Potter/Ten Speed Press. ISBN 0399581324.
- Moss, Robert F. (2010). Barbecue: The History of an American Institution. Tuscaloosa, Alabama: University of Alabama Press. ISBN 081731718X.
- Reed, John Shelton (2023). On Barbecue. Knoxville, Tennessee: University of Tennessee Press. doi:10.2307/jj.28697816. ISBN 1621906396.
- Lovegren, Sylvia (2013). Smith, Andrew (ed.). The Oxford Encyclopedia of Food and Drink in America (2nd ed.). New York City, New York: Oxford University Press USA. ISBN 0199734968.
- Stern, Jane; Stern, Michael (2011). Lexicon of Real American Food. New York City, New York: Simon and Schuster. ISBN 0762768304.
- Veteto, James R.; Maclin, Edward M. (2012). The Slaw and the Slow Cooked: Culture and Barbecue in the Mid-South. Nashville, Tennessee: Vanderbilt University Press. doi:10.2307/j.ctv16755s9. ISBN 0826518036.

=== Newspaper and magazine articles ===
- Burton, Monica (2018-09-05). "Whole Hog Is an American Tradition — So Why Is It Stuck in the South?". Eater.
- Vaughn, Daniel (2015-05-04). "Eastern North Carolina BBQ at Skylight Inn". Texas Monthly. Archived from the original on 2019-01-20.
- Vaughn, Daniel (2017-10-06). "West Tennessee Whole Hog". Texas Monthly. Archived from the original on 2024-03-06.
