= Hash (stew) =

Stew or gravy made of pork, offal and onions

Hash, often called pork hash or liver hash, is a name for a stew or gravy made of pork, offal and onions. It is usually paired with rice as "hash and rice". Hash is part of the cuisine of the Southern United States where it was invented as a way to use unappetizing cuts of meat. The dish is primarily consumed within the state of South Carolina, where it is commonly paired with barbecue. Many variations of hash exist, which include different combinations of meats and vegetables.

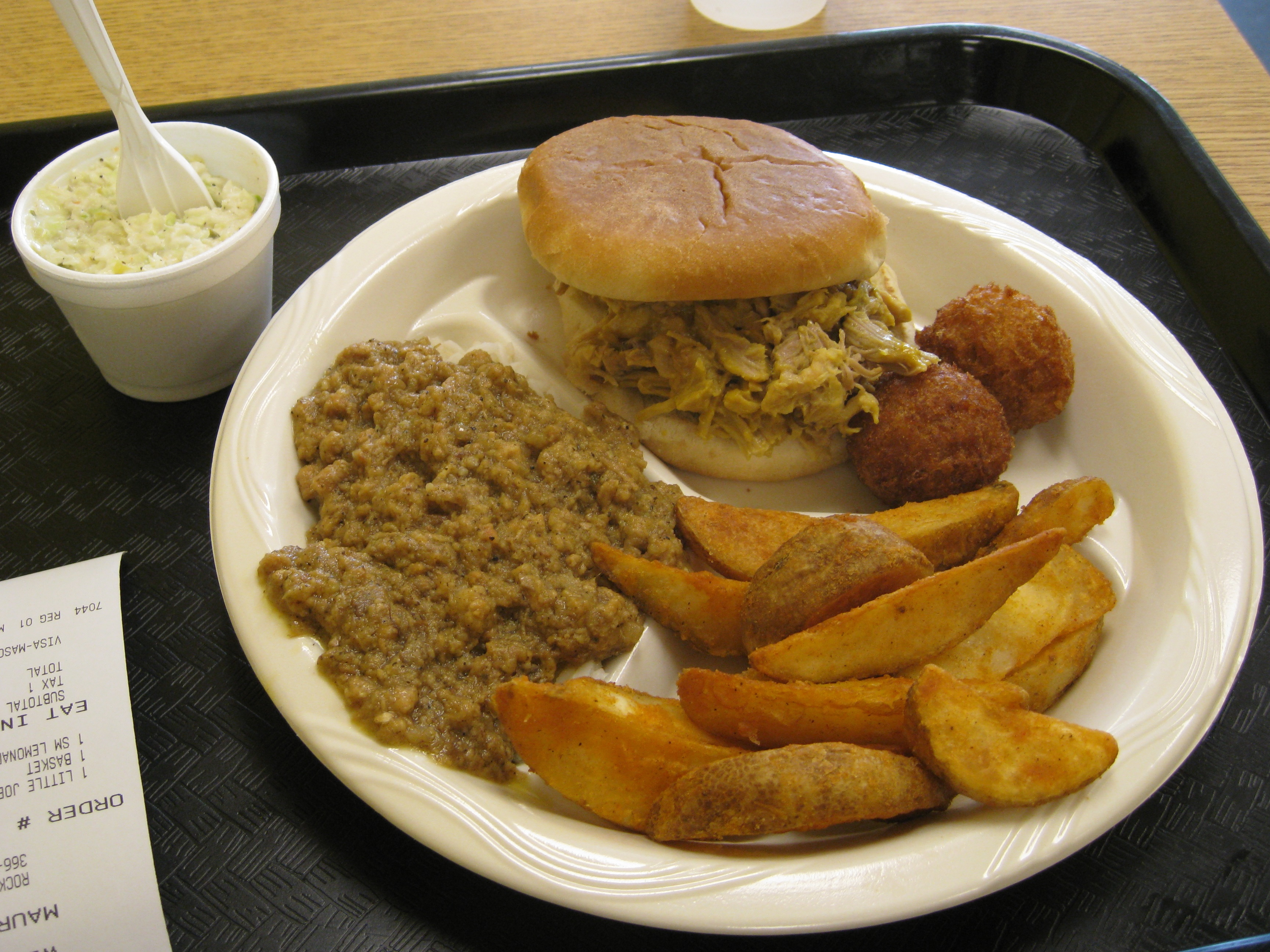
Barbecue plate with mustard-based hash

== History ==
It was invented by enslaved communities around the Savannah River prior to the American Civil War. The dish likely originated as a way to disguise cheaper, less appetizing cuts of meat left over from whole hog barbecue, including the head and organs, by cooking them down into a soft, heavily seasoned stew that could be eaten with a spoon. Food historian Robert F. Moss claims that the name "hash" probably comes from "haslet", an old English word for viscera. There are various folkloric traditions about hash, including the belief that it should be cooked under the light of the moon.

It became a common accompaniment to barbecue in South Carolina, served in restaurants and "hash houses". In the late 19th century, it was eaten in the neighboring state of Georgia but its popularity is mostly confined to South Carolina in the 21st century. A notable exception is Augusta, Georgia, which borders South Carolina, where hash is a part of the local food culture.

Traditionally, hash contained hog's heads and liver, but this became less common as restaurants stopped roasting whole hogs for their barbecue, and organ meats became less popular in the late 20th century. Instead, many modern barbecue restaurants prepare hash with leftover pulled pork, especially pork shoulder. A 2020 article in The Post and Courier claimed that hash was at risk of vanishing from South Carolina restaurants; however, Moss contested this claim in an article in Southern Living, noting that many newly opened restaurants in South Carolina added hash to their menus. A study of restaurants serving hash in South Carolina found that it was particularly popular around Columbia.

== Description ==
Hash is considered a stew or gravy. The primary ingredients in hash are pork, offal, onions, and seasonings which are slowly stewed together. Traditionally, hash was made by stewing the ingredients in an iron kettle over a wood fire, a method which is still used by some restaurants and hash houses. It is typically served over rice, as a dish called "hash and rice".

Several variations of hash exist, which include different combinations of ingredients. Vegetables such as potatoes and onions. Mustard is also commonly added to hash among German communities in the Midlands of South Carolina. Vinegar is often added to hashes in the South Carolina Lowcountry. In upstate South Carolina, hash often includes beef or a mixture of pork and beef with large amounts of onions.

== See also ==
- Brunswick stew, a similar dish
