= Barbecue in North Carolina =

Regional style of food preparation in the United States

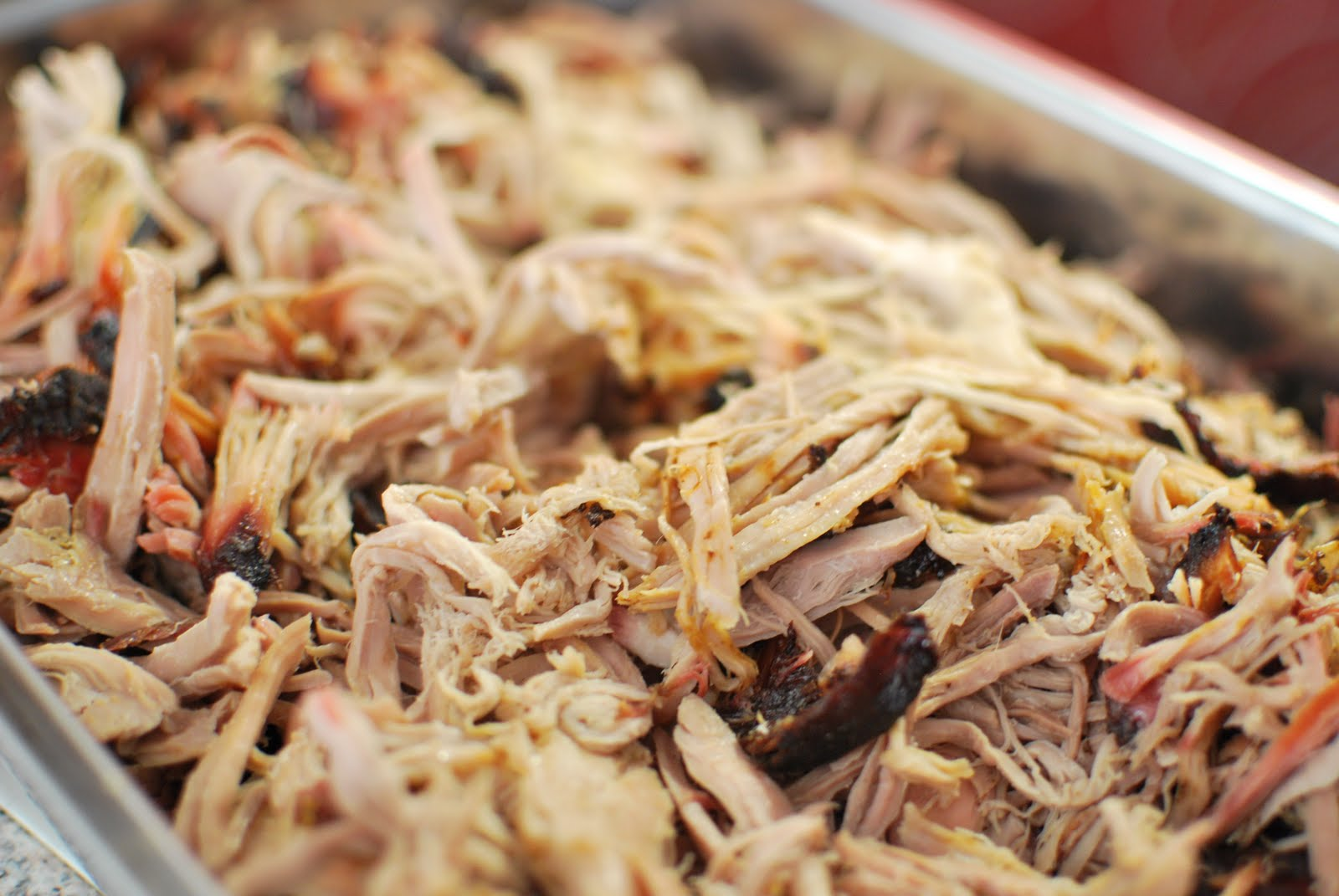
Carolina-style chopped pork barbecue

Barbecue is an important part of the heritage and history of the U.S. state of North Carolina. It has resulted in a series of bills and laws that relate to the subject, and at times has been a politically charged subject. In part, this is due to the existence of two distinct types of barbecue that have developed over the last few hundred years: Lexington style and Eastern style. Both are pork-based barbecues but differ in the cuts of pork used and the sauces they are served with. In addition to the two native varieties, other styles of barbecue can be found throughout the state.

== History ==
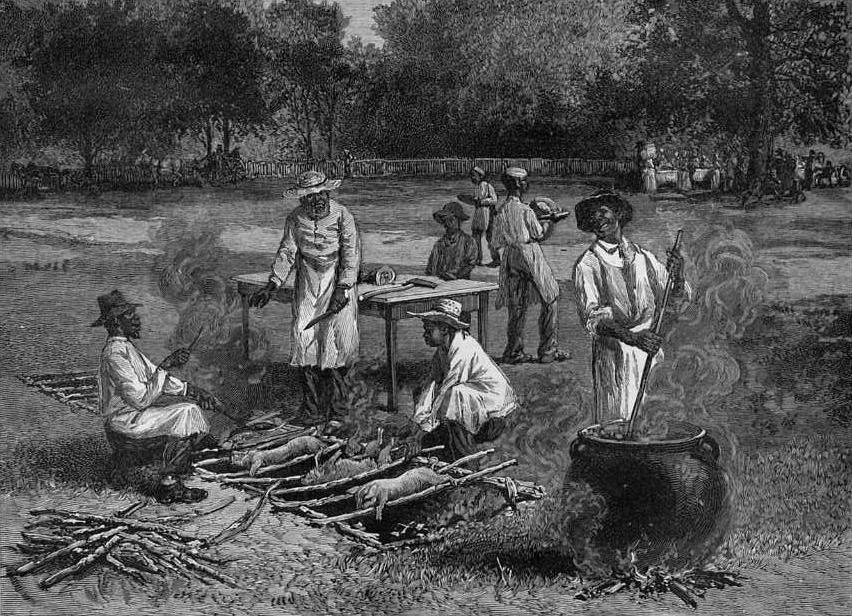
A barbecue pit depicted in A Southern Barbecue, 1887, by Horace Bradley

North Carolina barbecue benefits from a wide variety of influences, from Native Americans, to European settlers, to African Americans, and to modern influences, such as newer equipment and methods to cook the meat.

Social events such as weddings, church events, or other celebrations are often conducted around a main course of whole hog barbecue, spawning a whole subcategory of catering that specializes solely in this craft.

== The politics of barbecue ==
There is a somewhat light-hearted feud that exists between the proponents of the two types of barbecue: Lexington style and Eastern style. Author Jerry Bledsoe, the self-professed "world's leading, foremost barbecue authority" claimed that Dennis Rogers (columnist for The Raleigh News & Observer and self-professed "oracle of the holy grub"), "has ruined any chances of this state being distinguished in its barbecue." While a degree of humor is involved, choice of barbecue type is a politically charged topic. In 2006, North Carolina House Bill 21 and North Carolina Senate Bill 47 were introduced (and ultimately defeated), sparking controversy over one of the two different styles being declared "official", as they would have made the Lexington Barbecue Festival the official barbecue festival of North Carolina.

In a political compromise in 2007, NC House Bill 433 passed, granting the Lexington Barbecue Festival the title of "Official Food Festival of the Piedmont Triad Region of the State of North Carolina". This effectively bypassed any controversy regarding Eastern barbecue and the region, and prevented any confusion with the title creating a singular, official barbecue for the entire state.

== Types of barbecue ==
Just about any style of barbecue can be found in North Carolina, as the state has a diverse population. There are a few styles, however, that are historically and culturally significant. They are also the most commonly found in restaurants as well as private events.

=== Eastern style ===
Eastern-style barbecue is a whole-hog style of barbecue, often said to use "every part of the hog except the squeal". Eastern-style sauce is vinegar and pepper-based, with no tomato whatsoever. Eastern sauce is mostly used as a seasoning after the cooking (although it can also be used as a mop sauce while the hog is cooking).

The coleslaw served with eastern-style uses mayonnaise (or whipped salad dressing) almost universally. Coleslaw is often placed on the bun if eaten sandwich-style. Eastern Style is often "chopped" after the meat has been pulled from the bone to achieve finer texture while improving its ability to absorb and hold the thin, vinegar sauce.

=== Lexington style ===
Lexington-style barbecue (also called Piedmont- or Western-style) uses a red sauce, or "dip", made from vinegar, tomatoes, and usually red pepper flakes, along with other spices that vary from recipe to recipe. It is most common in the Piedmont and western areas of the state. This style uses only the pork shoulder section of the pig. As with other styles of barbecue, the recipes vary widely, and can include many different ingredients, and range from slightly sweet to hot and spicy. The sauce also serves as the seasoning base for "red slaw" (also called "barbecue slaw"), which is coleslaw made by using Lexington-style barbecue sauce in place of mayonnaise. Hushpuppies are usually consumed with pork shoulder and slaw. This style is typically served "pulled" or very lightly chopped which leaves larger strands of muscle fiber.

=== Pork ribs ===
Pork ribs are a common alternative to the two most common types of North Carolina barbecue and a variety of festivals and competitions are held annually. Baby back ribs, sometimes called top loin ribs, are short, succulent, well-marbled ribs cut from the center section of the loin. Spare ribs come from lower down the rib cage (from the sides and upper belly of the pig). They are not quite as tender as baby backs, but are thicker, longer, and more flavorful.

== Cooking methods ==
=== Pit style ===
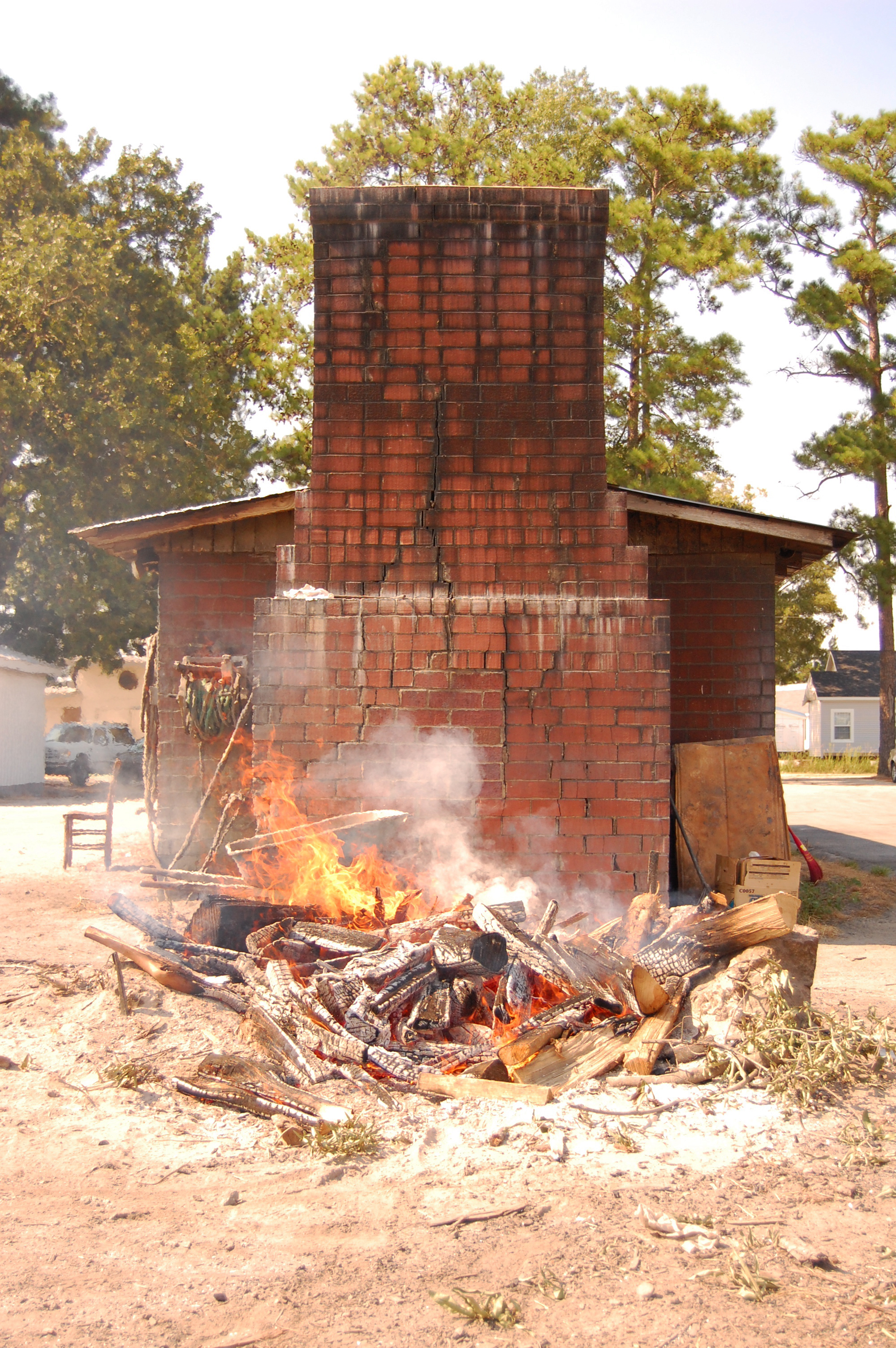
A wood-fired barbecue pit in Goldsboro

A pit barbecue is a method and constructed item for barbecue cooking meat and root vegetables buried below the surface of the earth. Indigenous peoples around the world used earth ovens for tens of thousands of years. In modern times the term and activity is often associated with the Eastern Seaboard, the "barbecue belt", colonial California in the United States and Mexico. The meats usually barbecued in a pit in these contexts are beef, pork, and goat, with pork being the predominant choice in North Carolina.

Pit barbecue can also refer to an enclosed, above-ground "pit" such as a horno or outdoor pizza oven. The method of cooking the meat is slow, using various hardwoods to flavor the meat. This breaks down the connective tissue in the meats, producing a tender product. The types of meat cooked in this fashion include both beef and pork.

=== Contrast to grilling ===
Oftentimes the two phrases "barbecuing" and "grilling" are mistakenly used as interchangeable words, although they imply completely different cooking methods. Grilling is a cooking method that uses dry heat, supplied by burning wood, charcoal or gas flame, and the heat is applied to the surface of the food being cooked. Typically food is cooked quickly using this method. Barbecuing is a slower process that uses lower heat and often the food is cooked by the heat of the smoke itself, rather than directly by the heat of the burning wood.

== Barbecue related festivals ==
=== Lexington Barbecue Festival ===
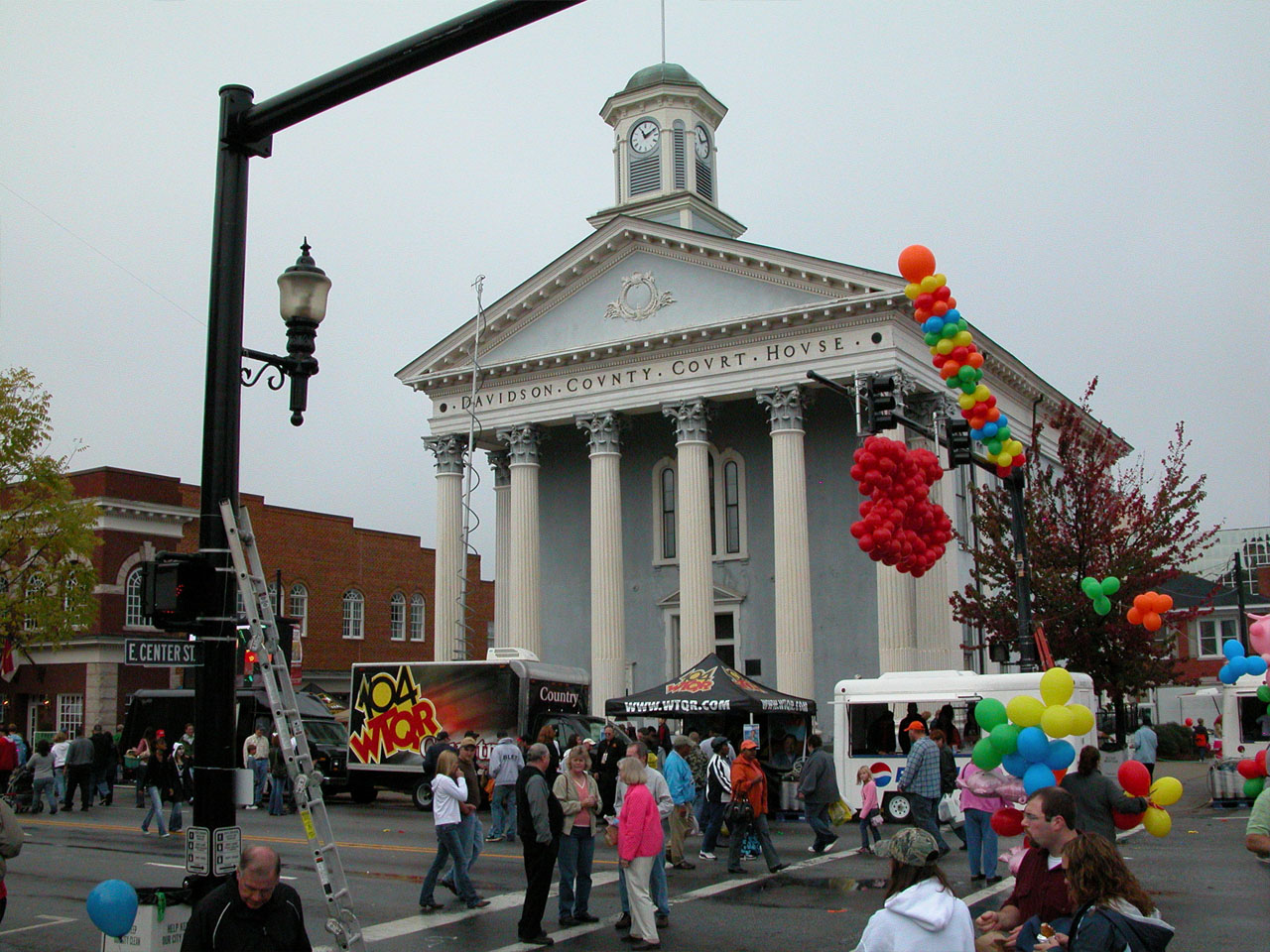
Lexington Barbecue Festival

The Lexington Barbecue Festival is a one-day festival held each October and attracts 160,000 or more visitors to Lexington, North Carolina. The festival is held each October in uptown Lexington, a city of approximately 20,000 residents. Several city blocks of Main Street are closed to vehicle traffic for the event. In addition to a barbecue competition there are carnival rides, a number of music and entertainment venues, and over 100 vendors from all over the region participating. It is the Official Food Festival of the Piedmont Triad Region of the State of North Carolina.

In 2012, the U.S. News & World Report ranked Lexington as #4 on its list of the best US cities for barbecue.

The annual event is listed in the book 1000 Places to See in the USA & Canada Before-You-Die, a part of the series based on the best-selling 1,000 Places to See Before You Die.

=== Other festivals ===
Additionally, a great number of other events of different sizes are held all over the state each year, attracting millions of visitors and adding to local economies.

== See also ==
- Smoking (food)
- Barbecue in South Carolina
- North Carolina Barbecue Society
- Red slaw
- Culture of North Carolina
- Roanoke-Chowan Pork-Fest
