= North Carolina Pork Council =

The North Carolina Pork Council is a nonprofit, chartered in 1962 and is the oldest state pork producer organization in the nation that has operated under a mandatory checkoff funding system. They are a funder of the North Carolina Plant Science Initiative at North Carolina State University.

The Council has been a long-time organizer of and sanctioned the Whole Hog State Barbecue Championship drawing over 130,000 attendees each year, raising over $100,000 for charities.
