= Coleslaw =

Salad with finely-shredded raw cabbage

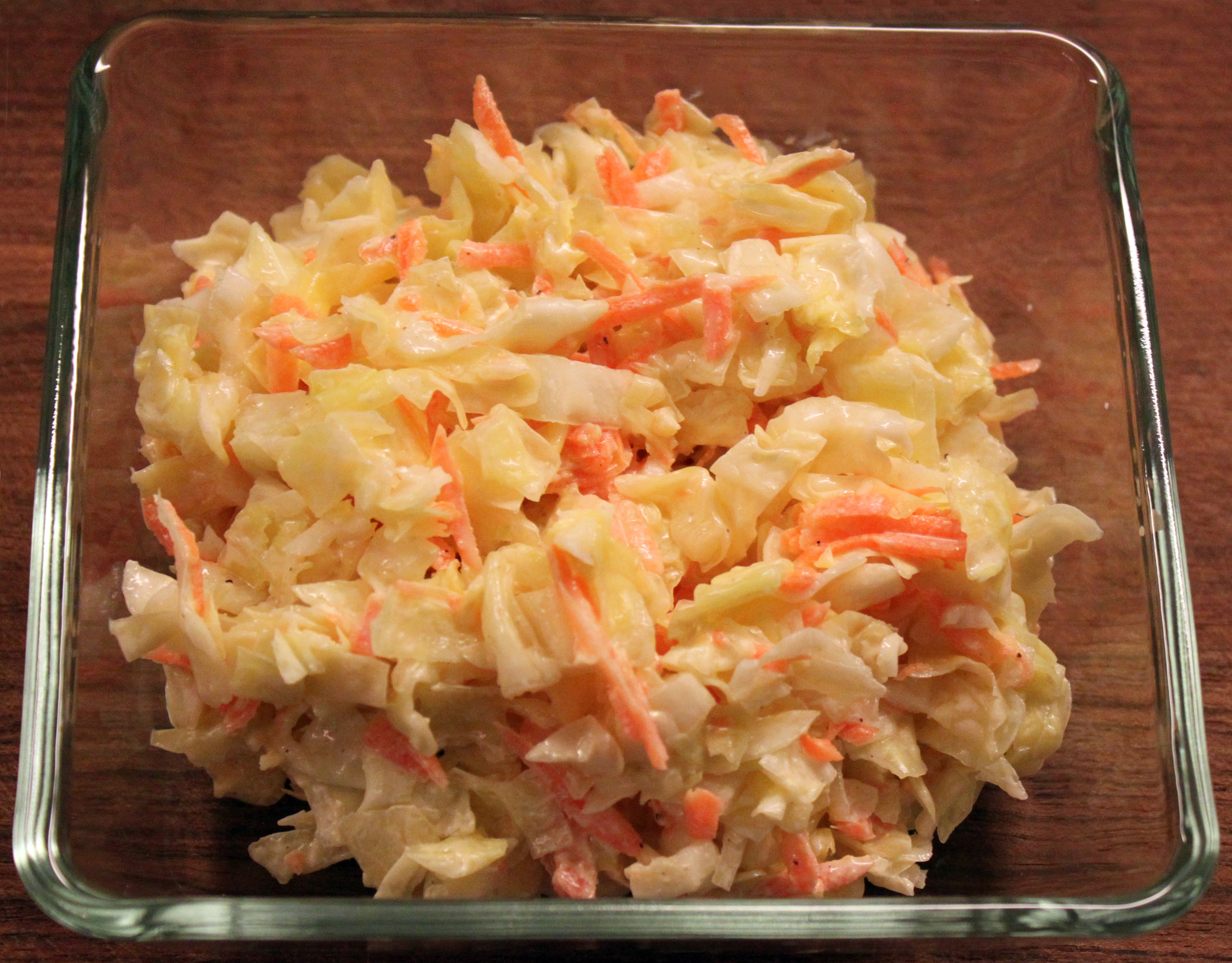
- Coleslaw made with mayonnaise
- Alternative names: Slaw
- Type: Salad
- Course: Side dish, condiment
- Place of origin: Netherlands
- Main ingredients: Fine shredded raw cabbage, carrot; vinaigrette (acetic acid (vinegar essence) or vinegar, vegetable oil, salt) or mayonnaise and salad cream

Coleslaw or cole slaw (from the Dutch term koolsla [ˈkoːlslaː], meaning 'cabbage salad'), also widely known within North America simply as slaw, is a side dish consisting primarily of finely shredded raw cabbage with a salad dressing or condiment, commonly either vinaigrette or mayonnaise. This dish originated in the Netherlands in the 18th century. Coleslaw prepared with vinaigrette keeps fresh longer due to effect of pickling.

Coleslaw has evolved into various forms globally. The only consistent ingredient in coleslaw is raw cabbage, while other ingredients and dressings vary widely. Some popular variations include adding red cabbage, pepper, shredded carrots, onions, grated cheese, pineapple, pears, or apples, and using dressings like mayonnaise or cream. Buttermilk coleslaw is most commonly found in the southern United States.

== History ==
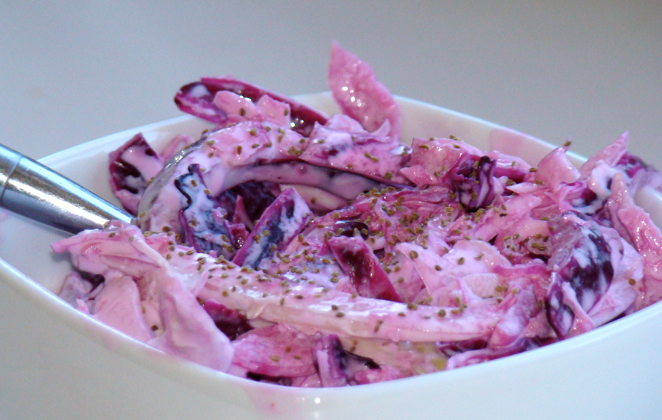
Purple cabbage coleslaw

The term "coleslaw" arose in the 18th century as an anglicisation of the Dutch term koolsla (kool in Dutch sounds like "cole") meaning "cabbage salad". The "cole" part of the word ultimately derives from the Latin caulis, meaning cabbage.

The 1667 Dutch cookbook The Sensible Cook (Dutch: De Verstandige Kock) contains a recipe attributed to the author's Dutch landlady, who mixed thin strips of cabbage with melted butter, vinegar, and oil. The most commonly prepared recipe for coleslaw is a recent innovation, owing to the development of mayonnaise during the mid-18th century.

According to The Joy of Cooking (1997), raw cabbage is the only entirely consistent ingredient in coleslaw; the type of cabbage, dressing, and added ingredients vary widely. Vinaigrette, mayonnaise, and sour cream-based dressings are all listed; bacon, carrots, bell peppers, pineapple, pickles, onions, and herbs are mentioned explicitly as possible added ingredients.

== Variations and similar dishes ==
There are many variations of the recipe, which include the addition of other ingredients such as red cabbage, pepper, shredded carrots, onion, grated cheese, pineapple, or apple, mixed with a salad dressing such as mayonnaise or cream. Various seasonings, such as celery seed, may be added. The cabbage may come in finely minced pieces, shredded strips, or small squares. Other slaw variants include broccoli slaw, which uses shredded raw broccoli instead of cabbage. Cream, sour cream, or buttermilk are also popular additions.

=== Europe ===
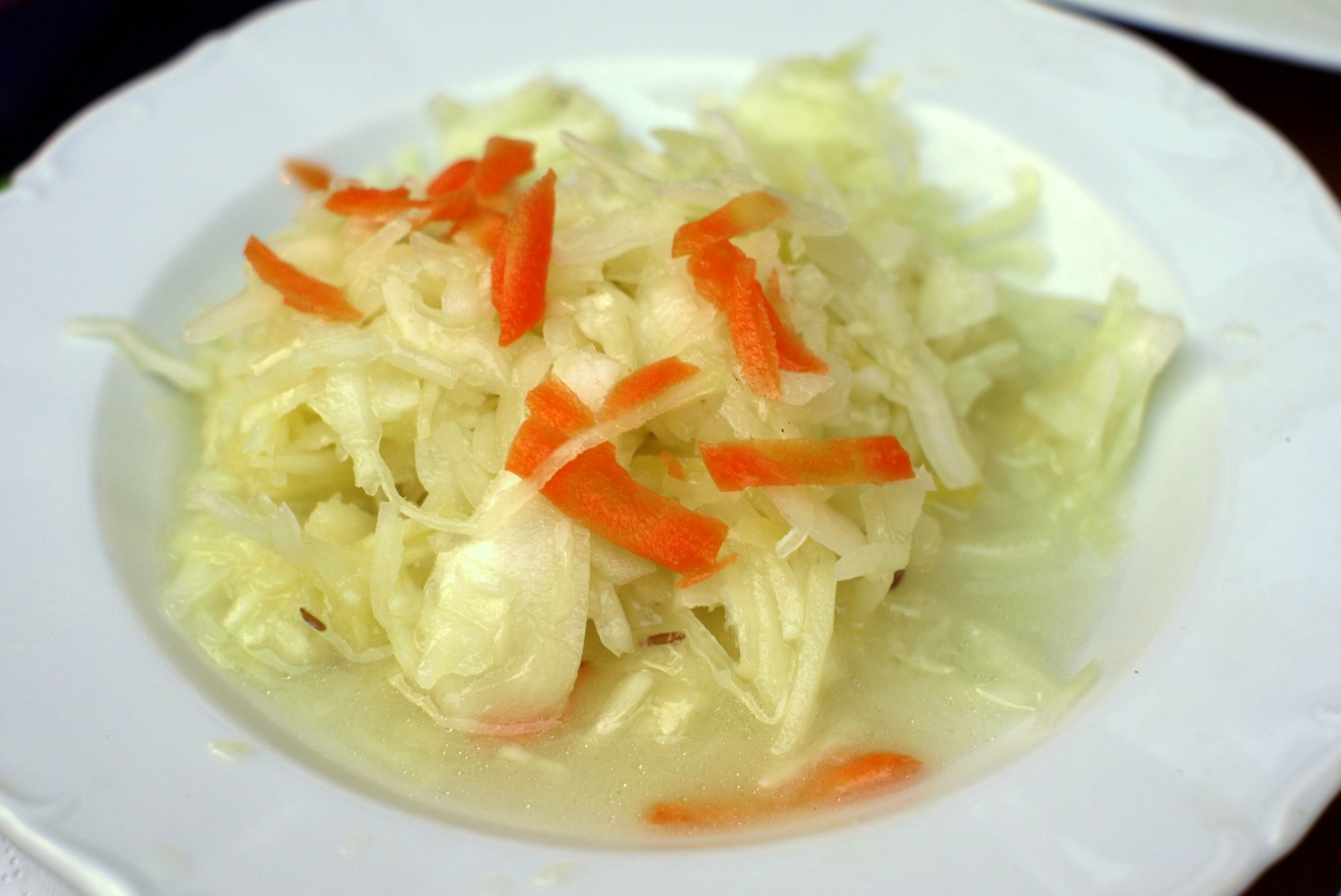
Krautsalat in Munich, Germany

Traditional German Krautsalat (cabbage salad) consists of finely shredded cabbage marinated with oil and vinegar. Sometimes onions or apples are added, and often it is seasoned with caraway.

Coleslaw with cooked ham and sliced pepper (julienne cut) in Italy is called insalata capricciosa (capricious salad).

In Poland, cabbage-based salads resembling coleslaw are commonly served as a side dish with the second course at dinner, next to meat and potatoes. There is no fixed recipe, but typical ingredients include shredded white cabbage (red and Chinese cabbage are also common), finely chopped onions, shredded carrots, and parsley or dill leaves, with many possible additions. These are seasoned with salt, black pepper and a pinch of sugar and tossed with a dash of oil (typically sunflower or rapeseed) and vinegar, while mayonnaise-based dressings are uncommon. An alternative, usually served with fried fish, is made with sauerkraut, squeezed to eliminate excess salty brine and similarly tossed with carrots, onions, black pepper, sugar and oil. Any simple salad of that kind, i.e. one made with shredded raw vegetables, is known as a surówka (Polish: surowy 'raw'). If cabbage is the base ingredient, it is called a surówka z (kiszonej) kapusty, or a "(soured) cabbage salad". The English name "coleslaw" is mainly associated with the mayonnaise-dressed cabbage. It is often written as "colesław" or "kolesław" (pronounced [kɔˈlɛswaf]) (the latter by analogy with Bolesław).

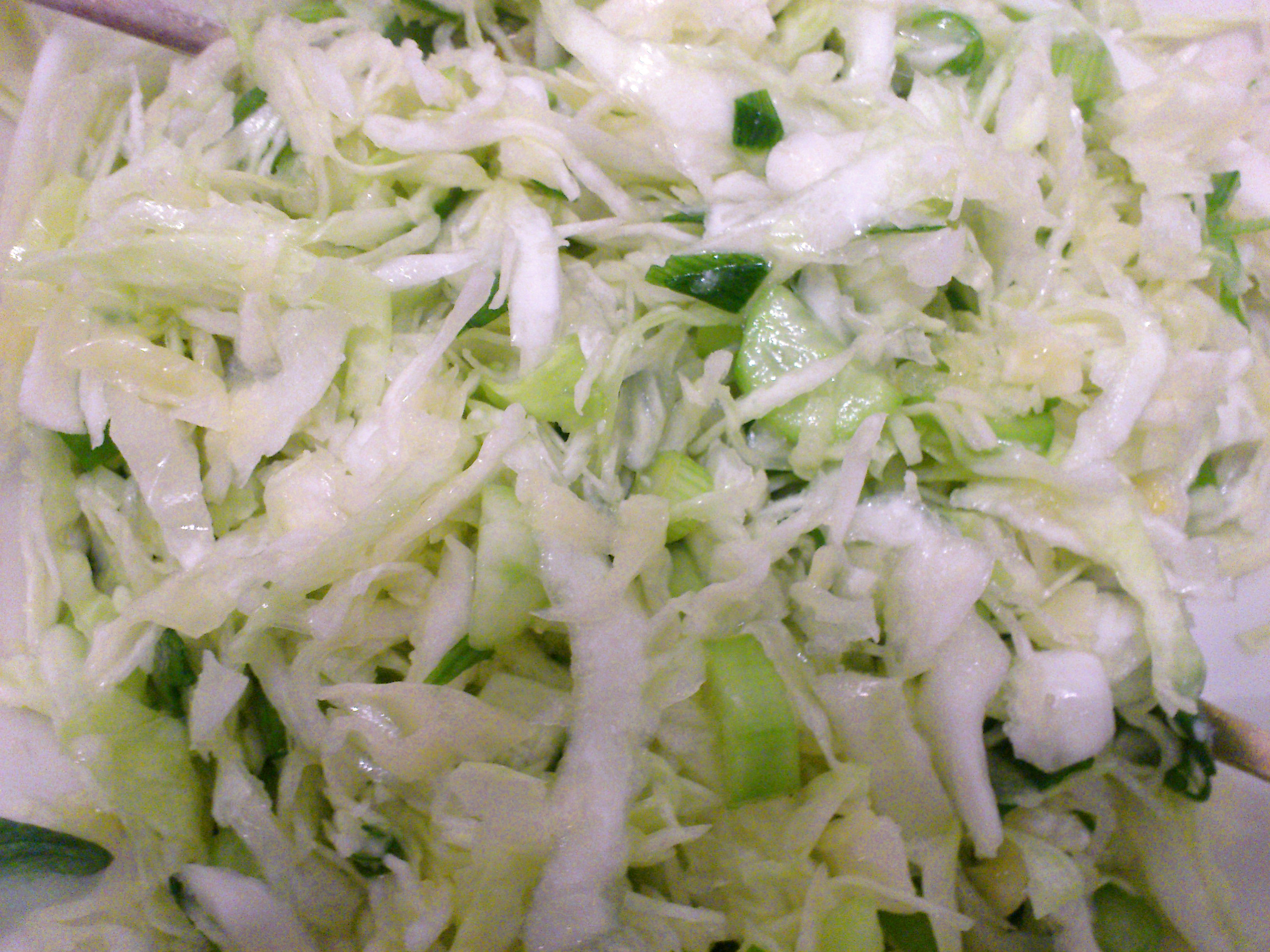
A Russian and Ukrainian variety dressed with sunflower oil

In Eastern Slavic cultures (Russia, Ukraine and Belarus), a salad of fresh shredded cabbage mixed with carrots, apples, cranberries etc., is traditionally dressed with unrefined sunflower oil. The cabbage can be marinated before with vinegar producing cabbage provençal (Russian: капуста провансаль, romanized: kapusta provansal). A similar salad is also made of sauerkraut.

In Sweden, a particular type of cabbage salad made with a seasoned vinaigrette is usually served with pizza and known as pizzasallad (pizza salad). When other vegetables are added, the recipe may be called råkostsallad (raw-food salad) or veckosallad (week salad), noting its long fridge-life. The term coleslaw (Swedish: coleslaw, or Swedish: kålsallad) is reserved for cabbage salad with mayonnaise-based dressing and is typically seen as American cuisine.

In the United Kingdom, coleslaw often contains carrot and onion in addition to cabbage and is usually made with mayonnaise or salad cream. Some variations include grated cheese such as cheddar, nuts such as walnuts.

=== Canada ===
In Montreal, coleslaw is a fixture on or with most hearty dishes typically found in takeout or fast-food establishments. The Montreal hot dog is most popularly served with coleslaw atop the sausage. With a rougher, crunchier texture and sharper, "kick-forward" taste profile, Montreal-style coleslaw differs significantly from the American variations, and is most similar to European chopped cabbage dishes described above. Unlike American coleslaws, Montreal-style coleslaw is vinegar-based, does not use mayonnaise, cream-based dressings or excessive oil, and is more coarsely chopped. In some classical variations, sunflower oil is used to build the dressing.

=== United States ===
In the United States, coleslaw often contains buttermilk, mayonnaise or substitutes, and carrot. However, many regional variations exist, and recipes incorporating prepared mustard or vinegar without the dairy and mayonnaise are also common.

Throughout the South, coleslaw is served alongside hushpuppies and French fries as side dishes for fried fish. Coleslaw is also a popular side dish with barbecue.

In North Carolina, coleslaw is fine and vinegary and served with barbecue. In the Lexington, North Carolina area, red slaw is made using ketchup and vinegar rather than mayonnaise. It is frequently served alongside North Carolina barbecue, including Lexington style barbecue, where, unlike in the rest of the state, a red slaw is the prevailing variety.

In Memphis, Tennessee, coleslaw has mayonnaise and is served as a topping in pulled pork barbecue sandwiches. Hot slaw, which is flavored with jalapeño chilies and mustard, was named the first official state food of Tennessee in 2024.

== See also ==
- Sauerkraut
- List of cabbage dishes
