= Pigs in the City =

Public art program in Lexington, NC, USA

Coordinates: 35.816768°N 80.258643°W

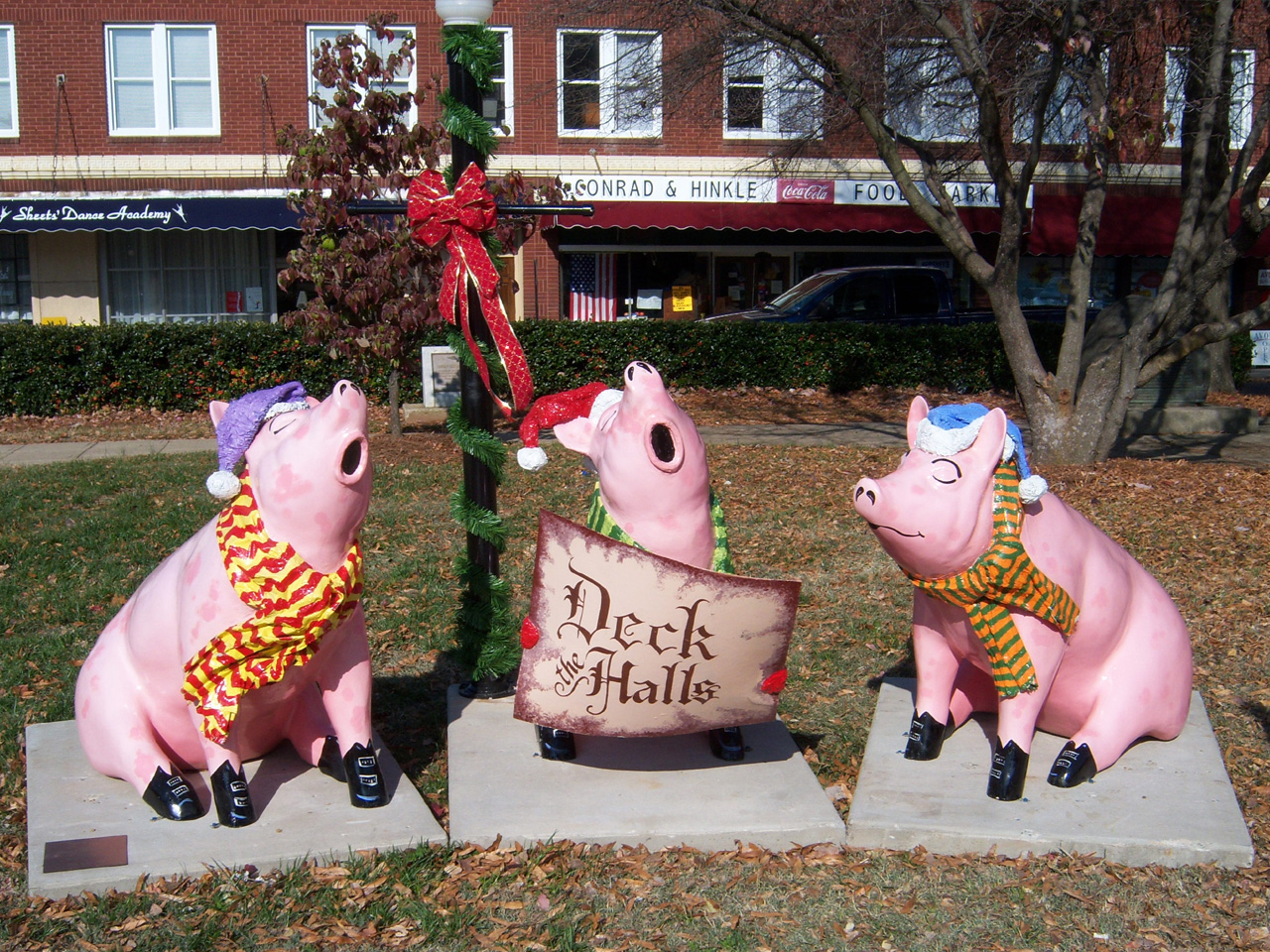
Pigs in the City – "Singing" pigs

Pigs in the City is a public art initiative coordinated by Uptown Lexington, Inc., a non-profit organization created to revitalize the downtown (or locally called "uptown") area of Lexington. It includes a near annual event held in the fall in the uptown business district of Lexington, North Carolina, U.S., the self-proclaimed Barbecue Capital of the World. It is part of a larger downtown revitalization effort which has gained significant media attention due its unusual artistic display of full-size ornamental pigs and draws visitors from all over North Carolina. The event is free to the public.

== History ==
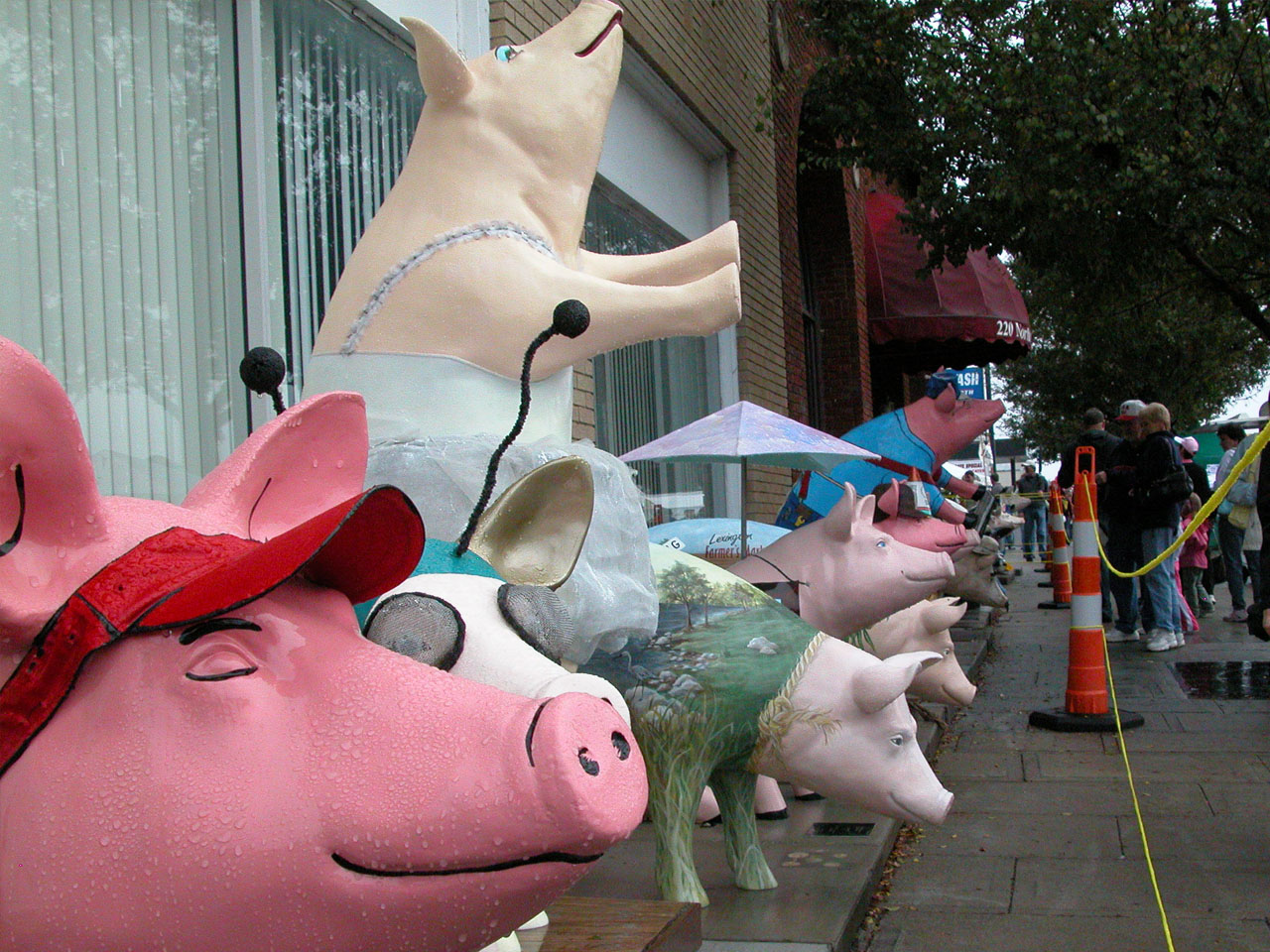
Pigs on Parade displayed after the official event during the Barbecue festival. During the actual event, they are spread throughout the district instead of shown together like this.

During the 2004 "North Carolina Main Street" 24th Annual Awards Banquet, Pigs in the City won Best Downtown Special Event for their first event in 2003. The event drew over 40,000 visitors from all over the state in its first year. It became an annual event after 2006. The cost to "sponsor" one of the 20 pigs on display was $1,000 during the first exhibition, which paid for the initiative. There was some controversy as the "Root for the Troops" pig was stolen from its perch in front of the Army & Navy Store on Main Street.

The fourth annual "Pigs in the City" event was held from May 23 through October 23, 2008, and was called "Power of the Pig." The pigs were also on display during the 25th Anniversary Lexington Barbecue Festival and during the Official Food Festival of the Piedmont Triad Region of the State of North Carolina, a one-day event that usually draws up to 150,000 visitors from all over the nation to Lexington, a town of about 20,000 residents.

Some of the themes for Pigs in the City 4 include Pigahontas, Tanya "Cabbage Patch" Burcham, This Little Piggy went to Market, Mr. Porkwrench, Huckleberry Pig and Girl Snout.

== Display ==
A number of artistic pigs are on display throughout the walkway of uptown Lexington, around the entire city square. The pigs are primarily made of fiberglass, and decorated and painted by local artists, each with their own theme. While some pigs are displayed for more than one year, new pigs are created for each year's display.

== Gallery ==
Some of these are past entries that are now on permanent display throughout Lexington, or at Uptown Lexington, Inc. main office.

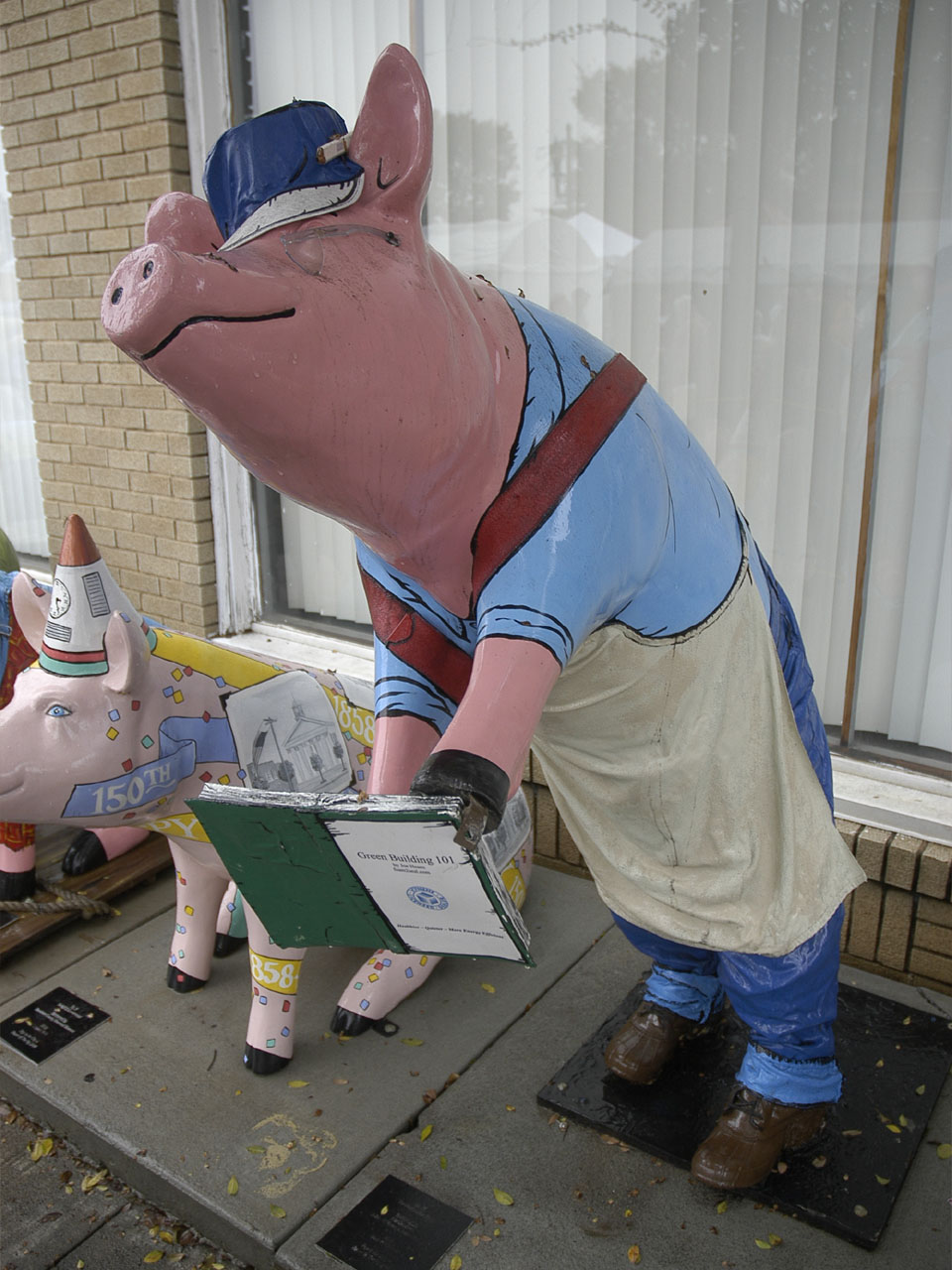
Carpenter pig

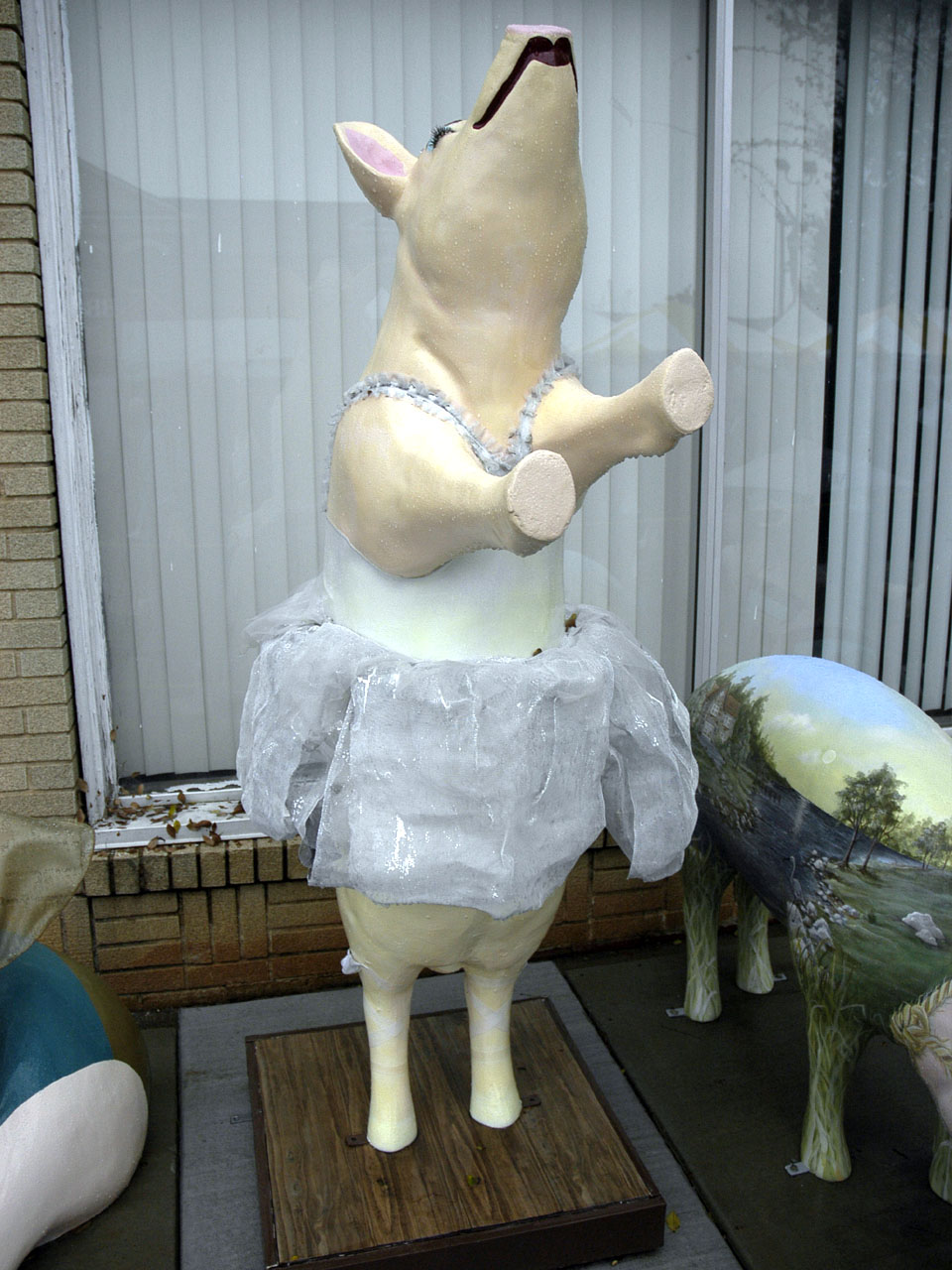
Swine Lake

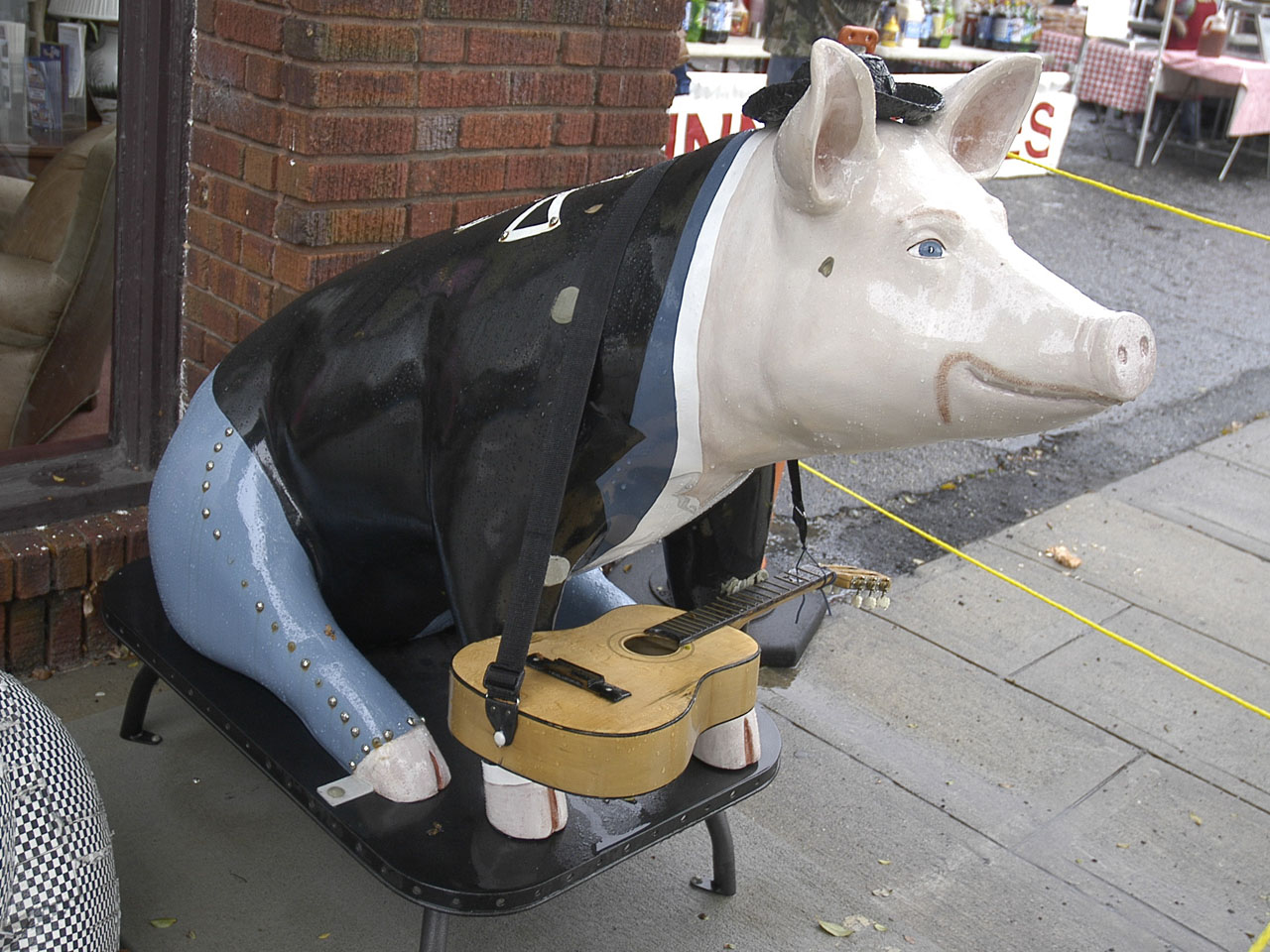
Pig Pickin'

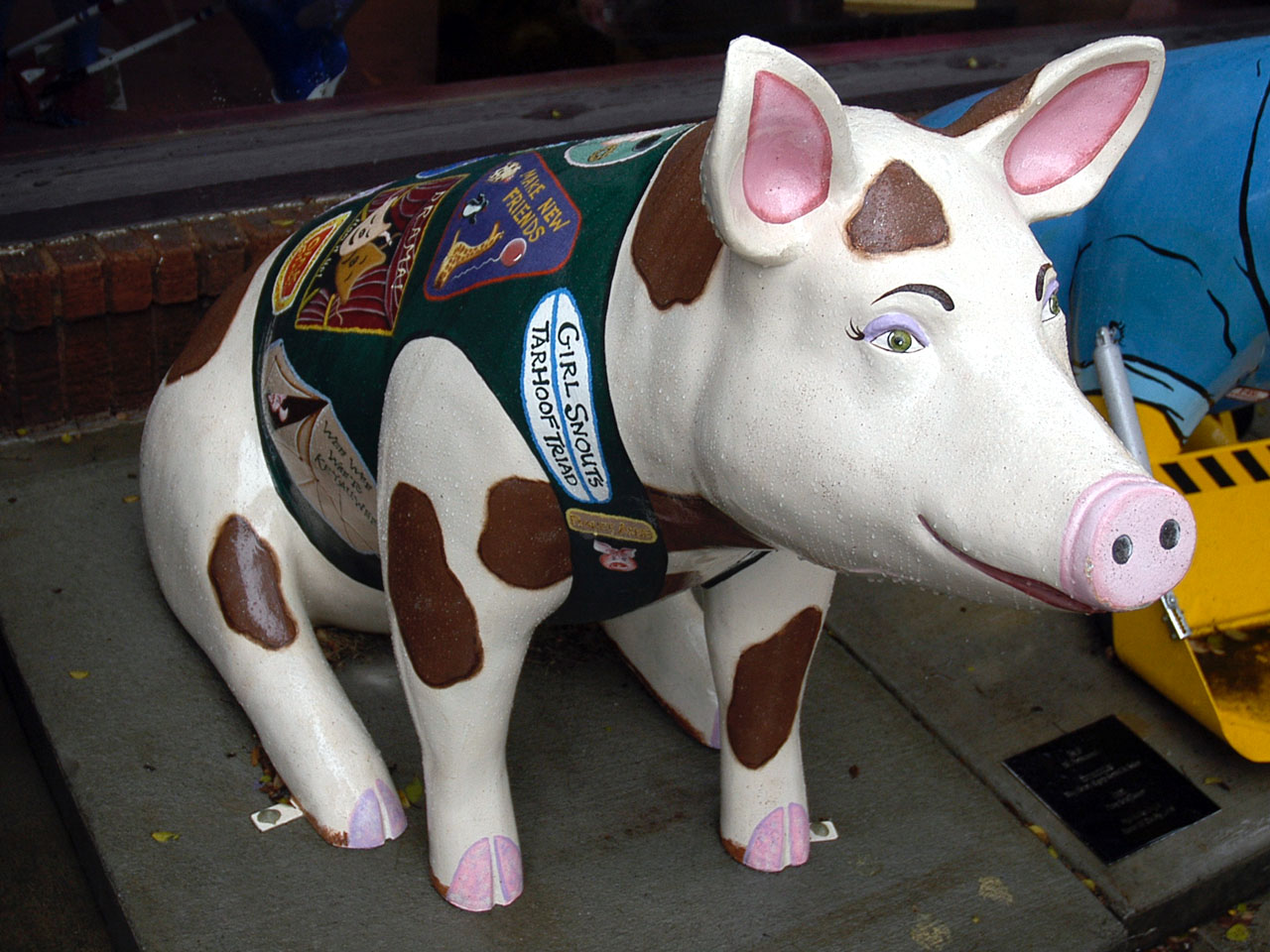
Girl Snout

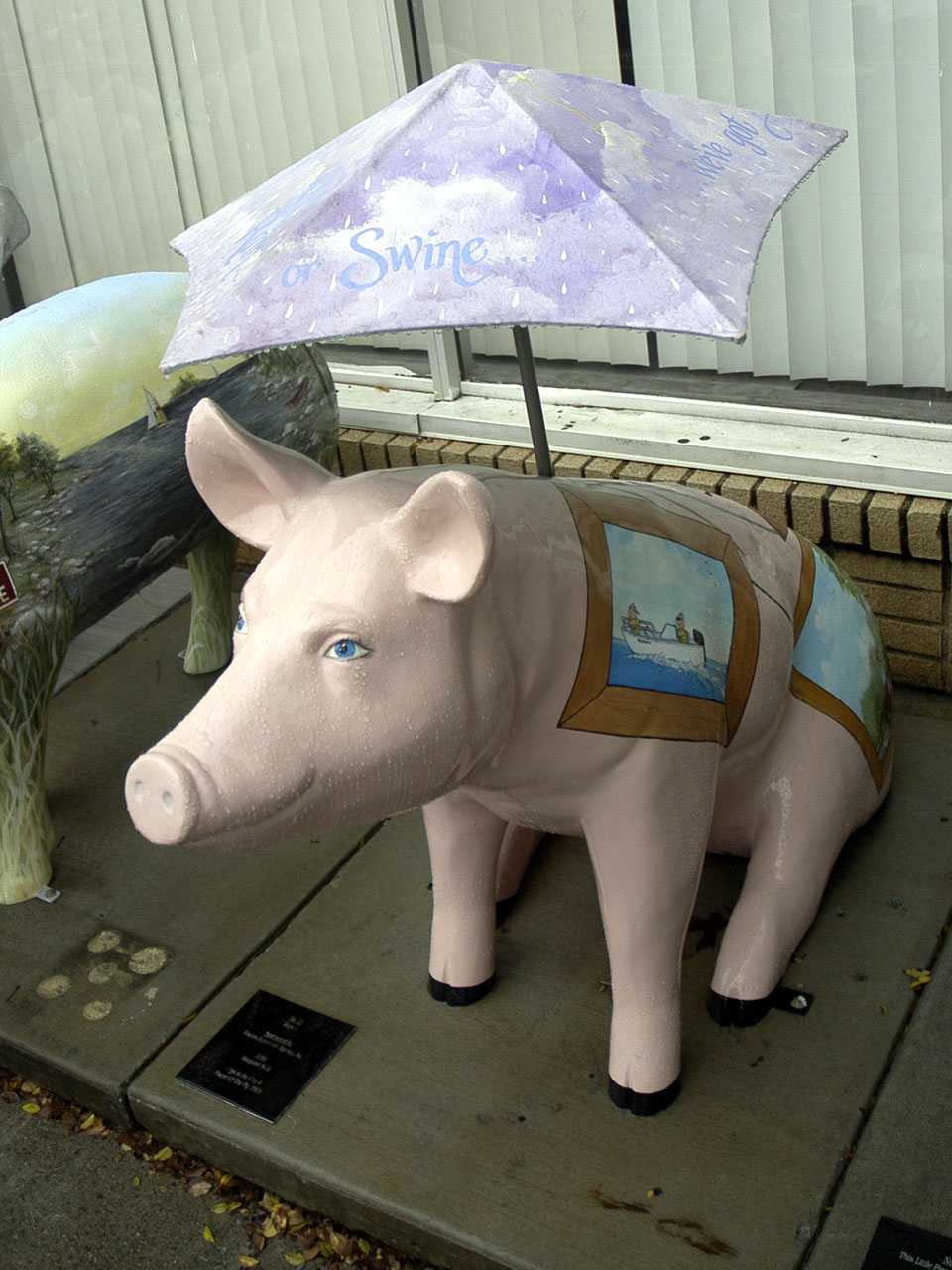
Rain or Swine

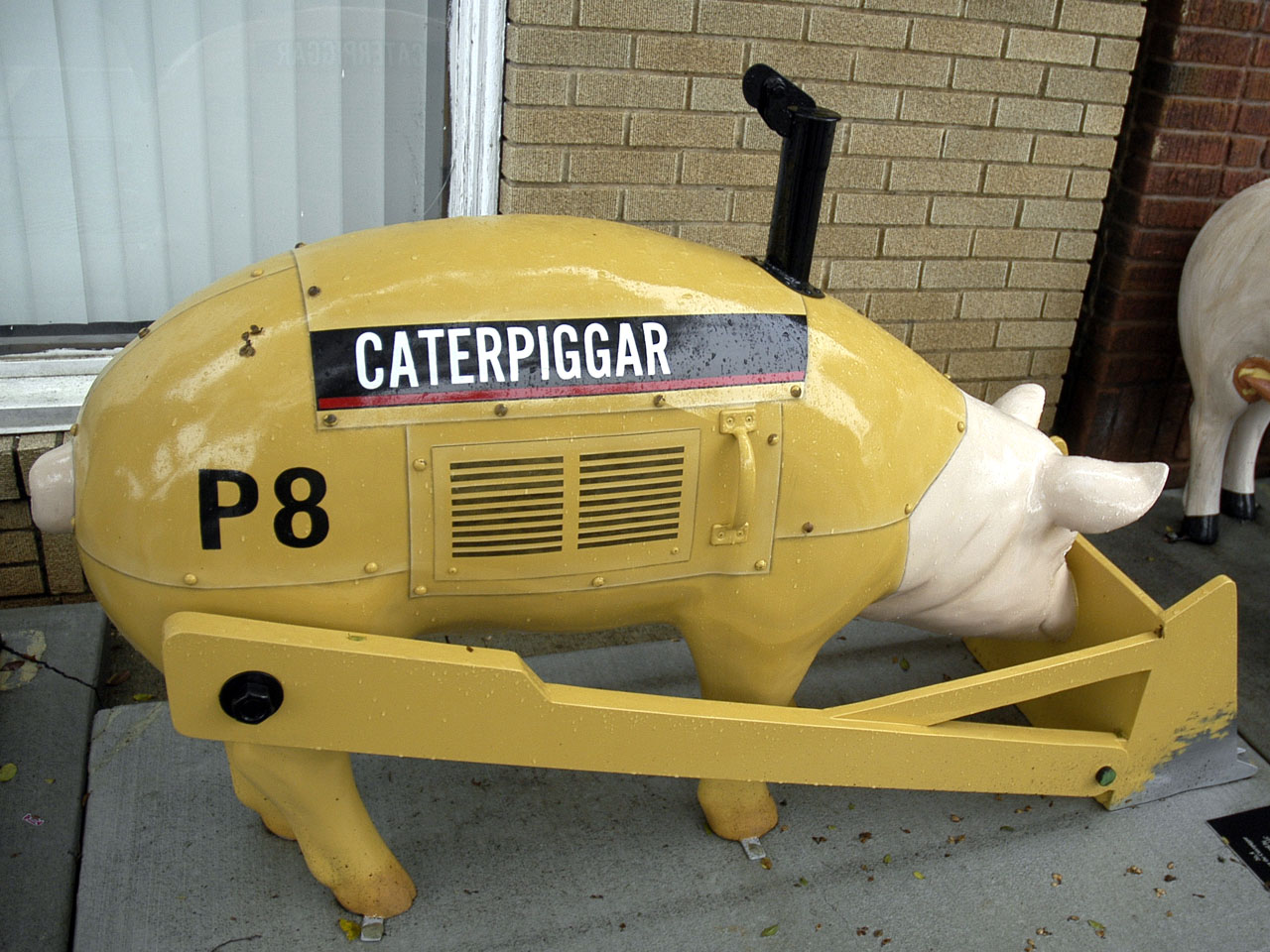
Digger the Caterpiggar

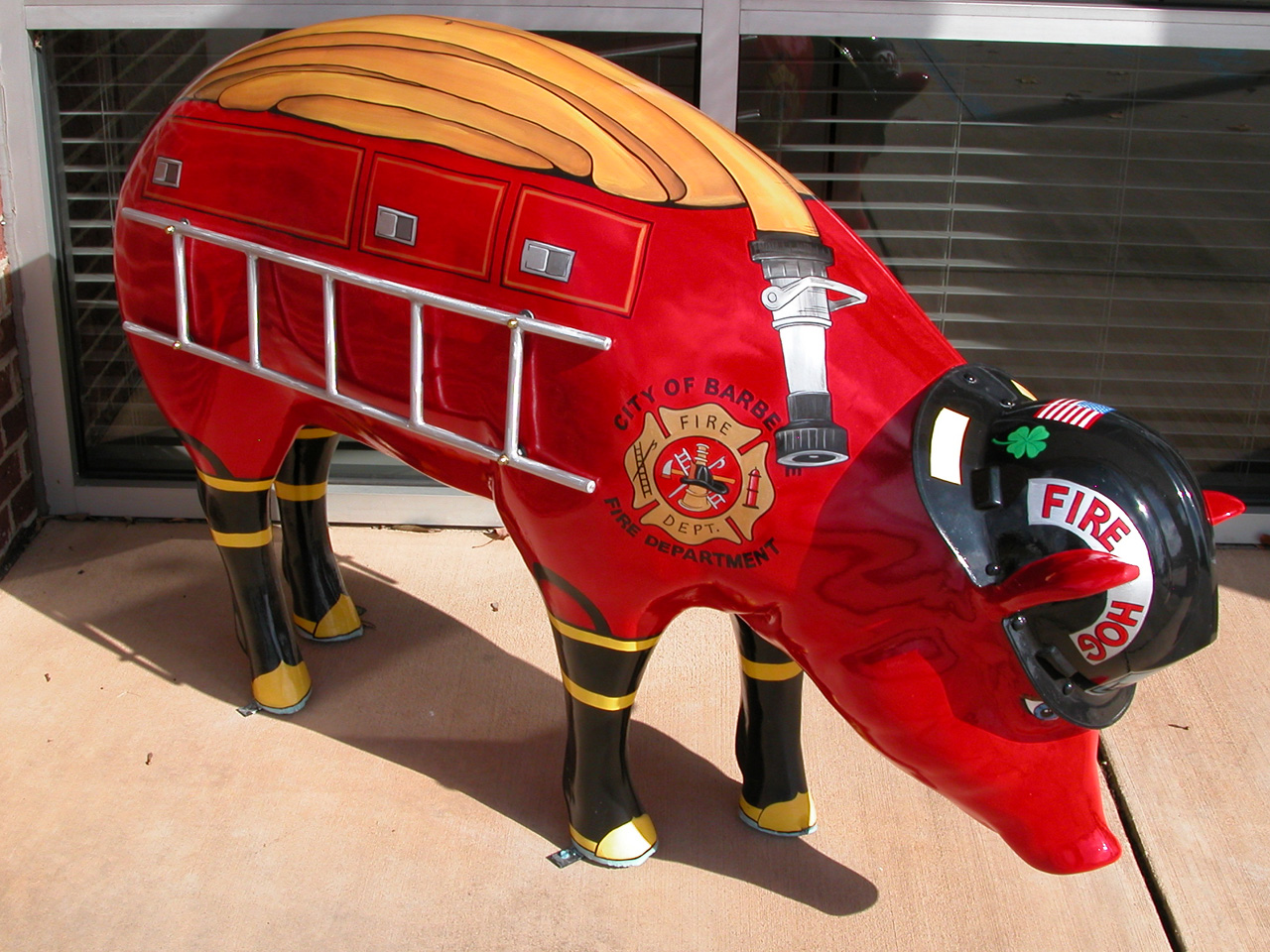
Fire Hog at the Lexington Fire Dept. HQ

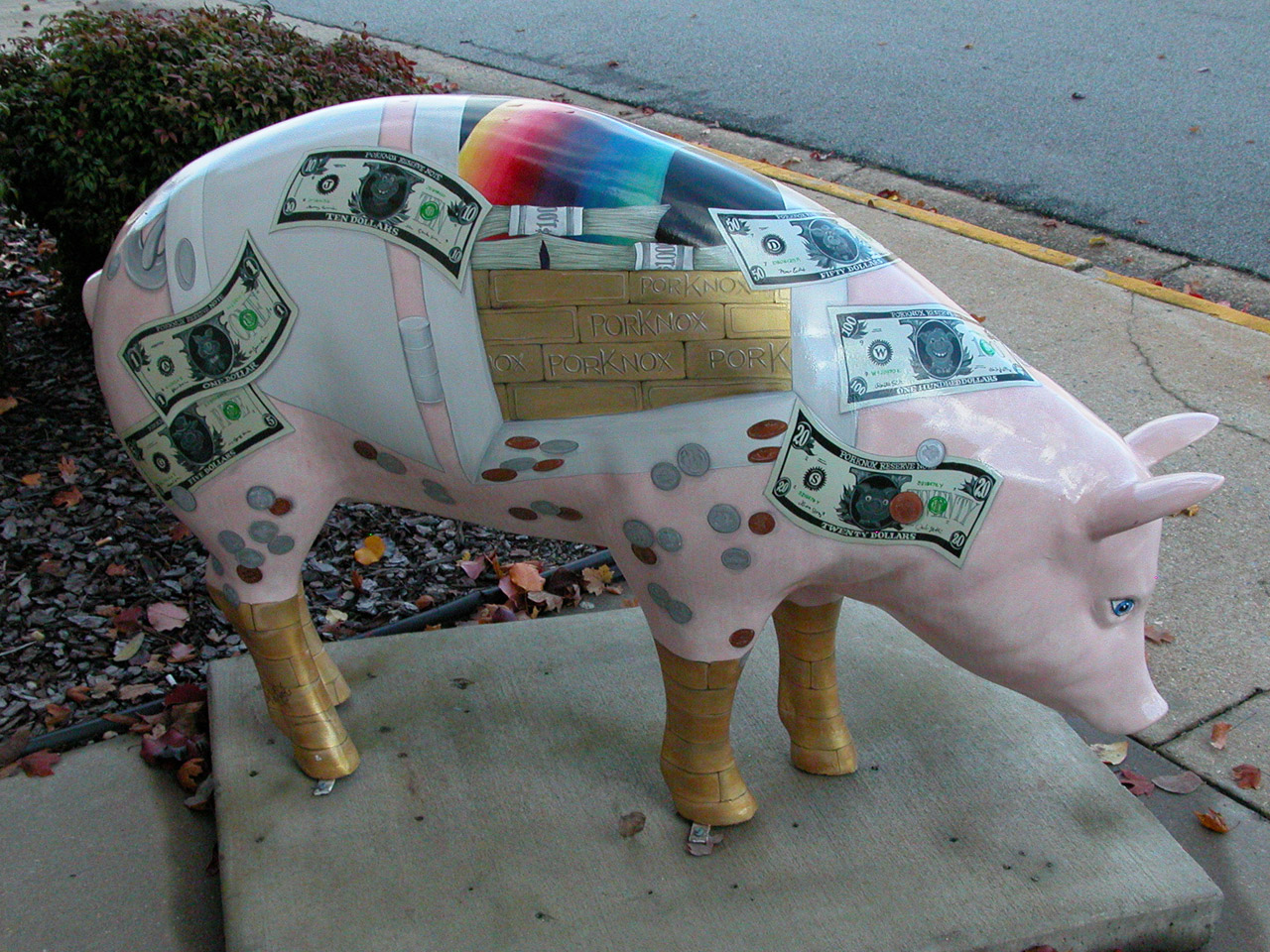
Porknox

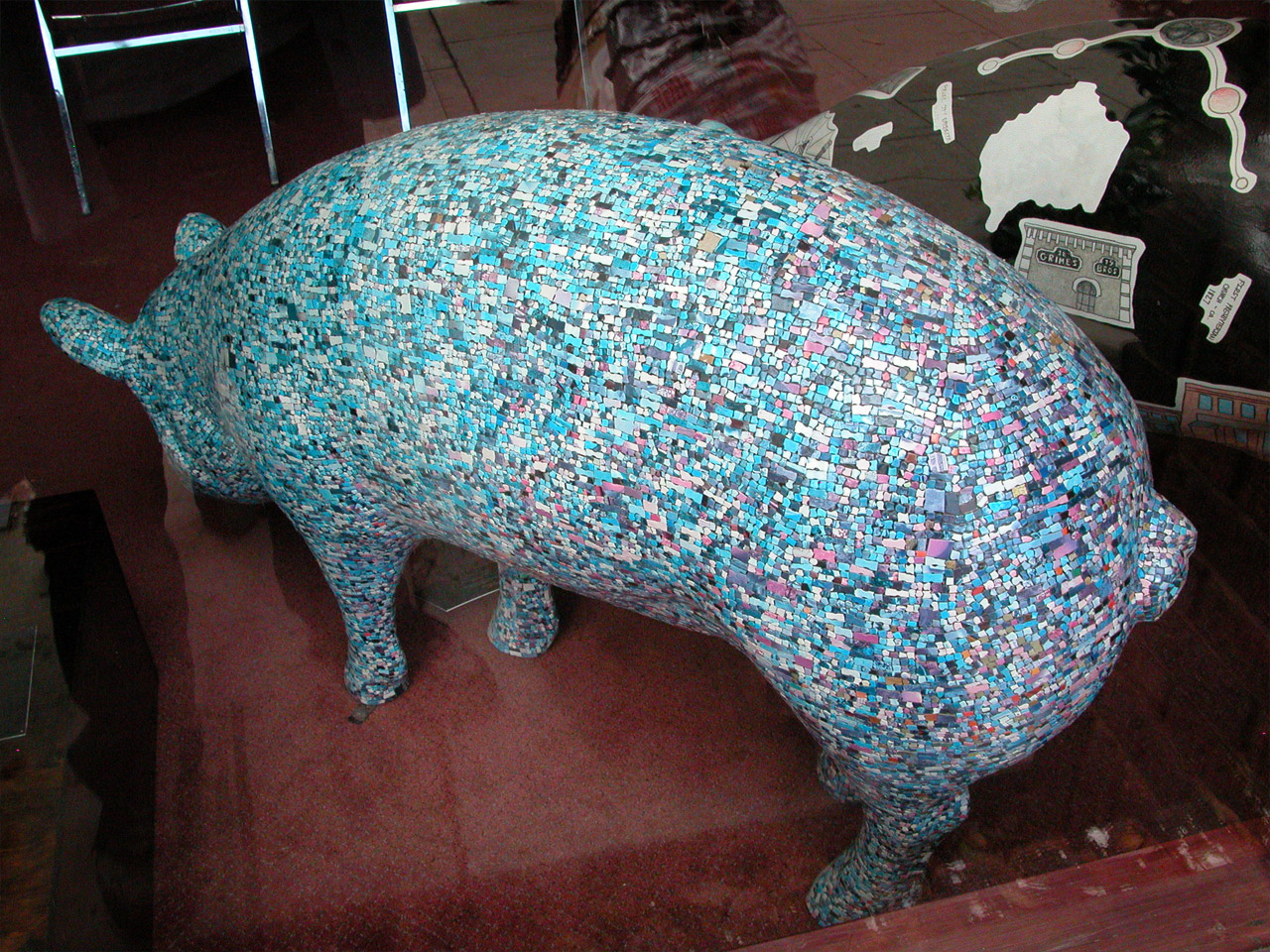
Pigsaw

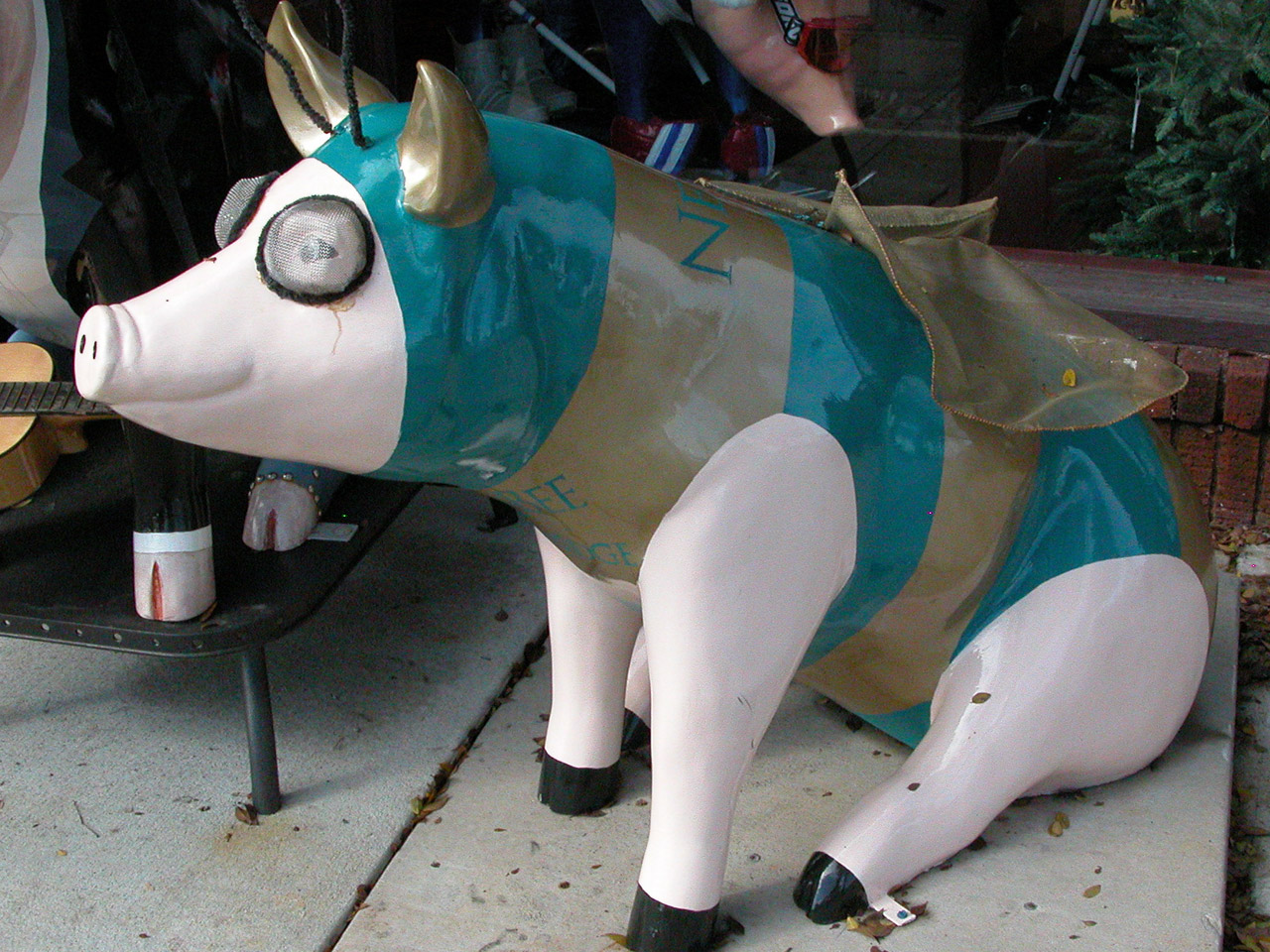
Newbee

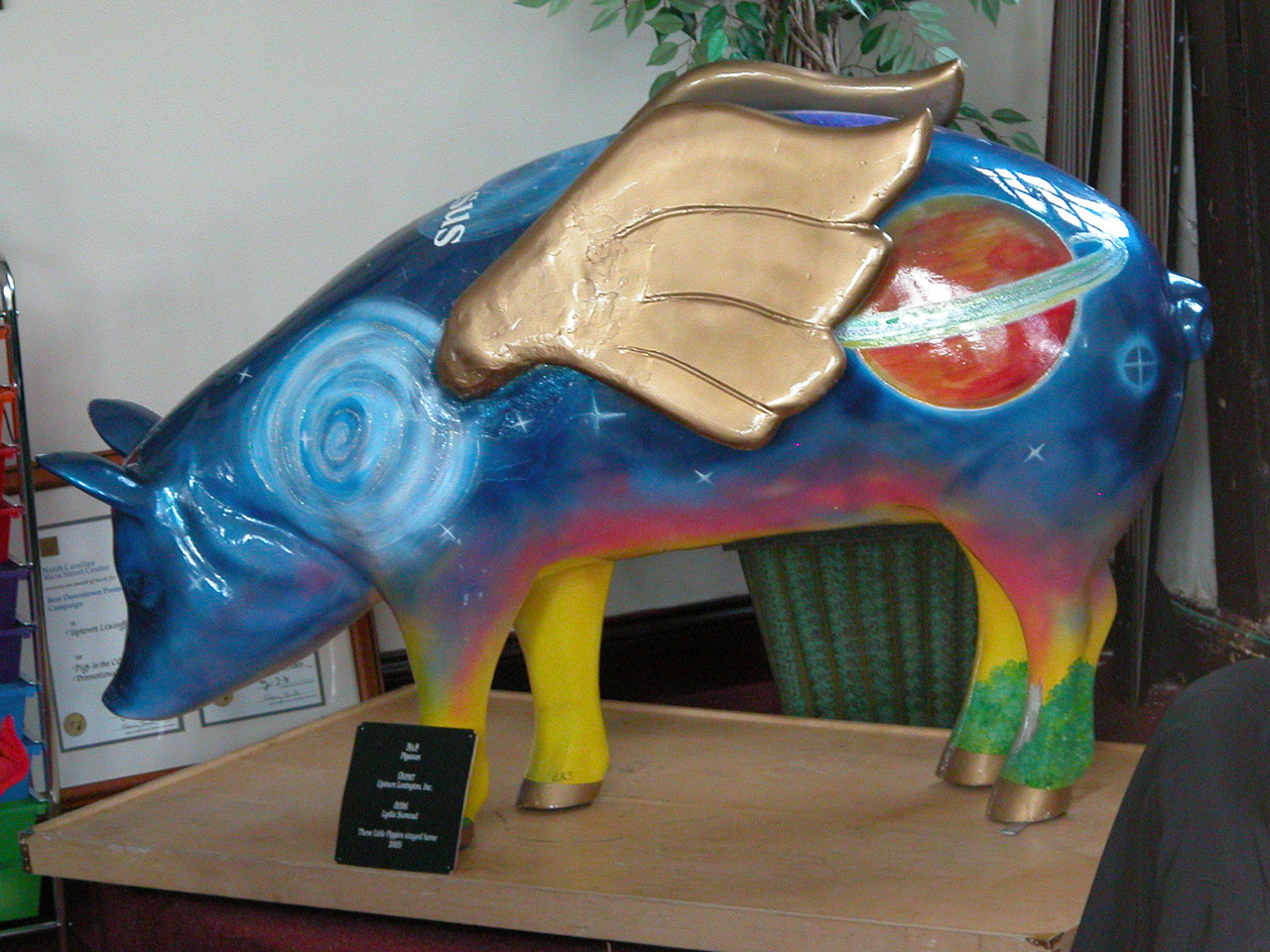
Pigasus

== See also ==
- Big Pig Gig, another public art exhibit that featured pigs
- CowParade
- Elephant Parade
- Lexington Barbecue Festival
- North Carolina Barbecue Society
