= Polish cuisine =

Culinary traditions of Poland

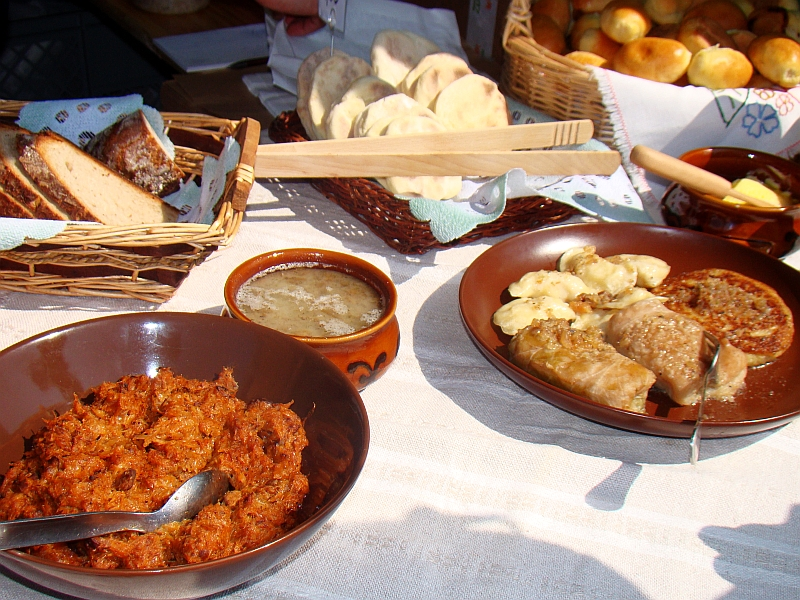
Complementary traditional Polish farmers food (bigos stew, pierogi dumplings, gołąbki cabbage rolls, skwarki cracklings)

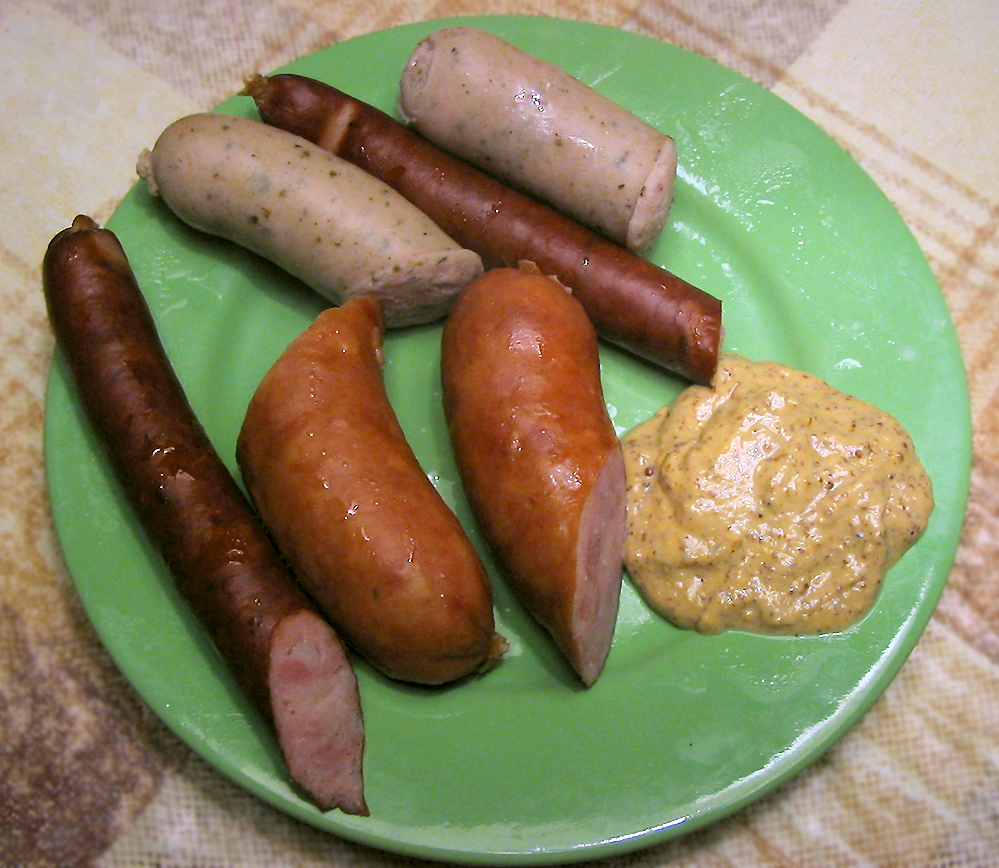
Various kinds of Polish kiełbasa sausages. From the top down: biała, kabanos, and wiejska with mustard.

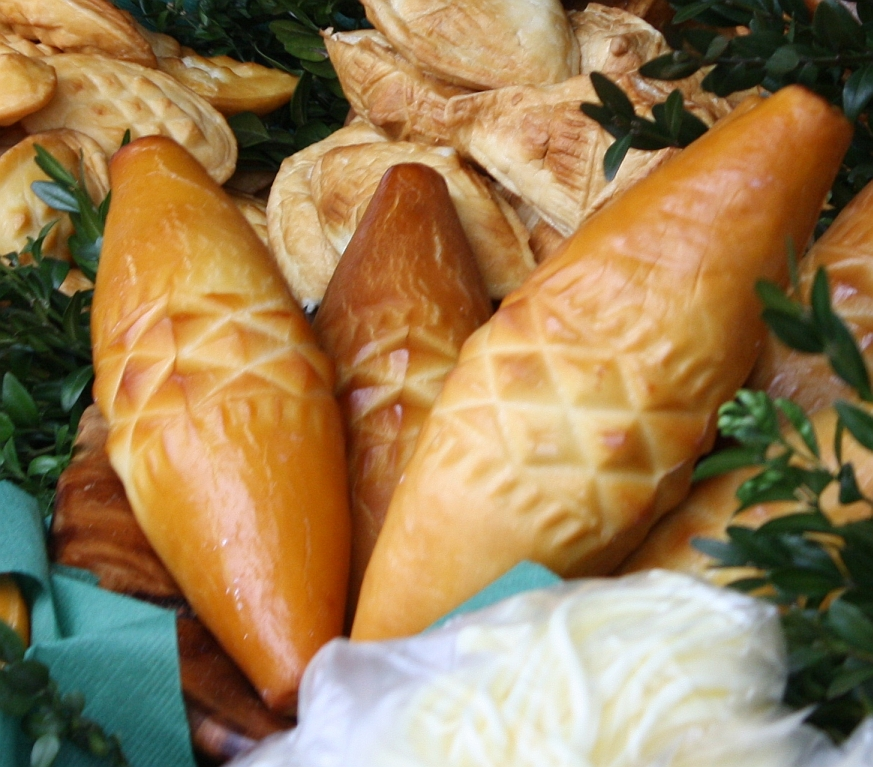
Oscypek, a Polish smoked cheese and traditional food of the Goral people in the Tatra Mountains

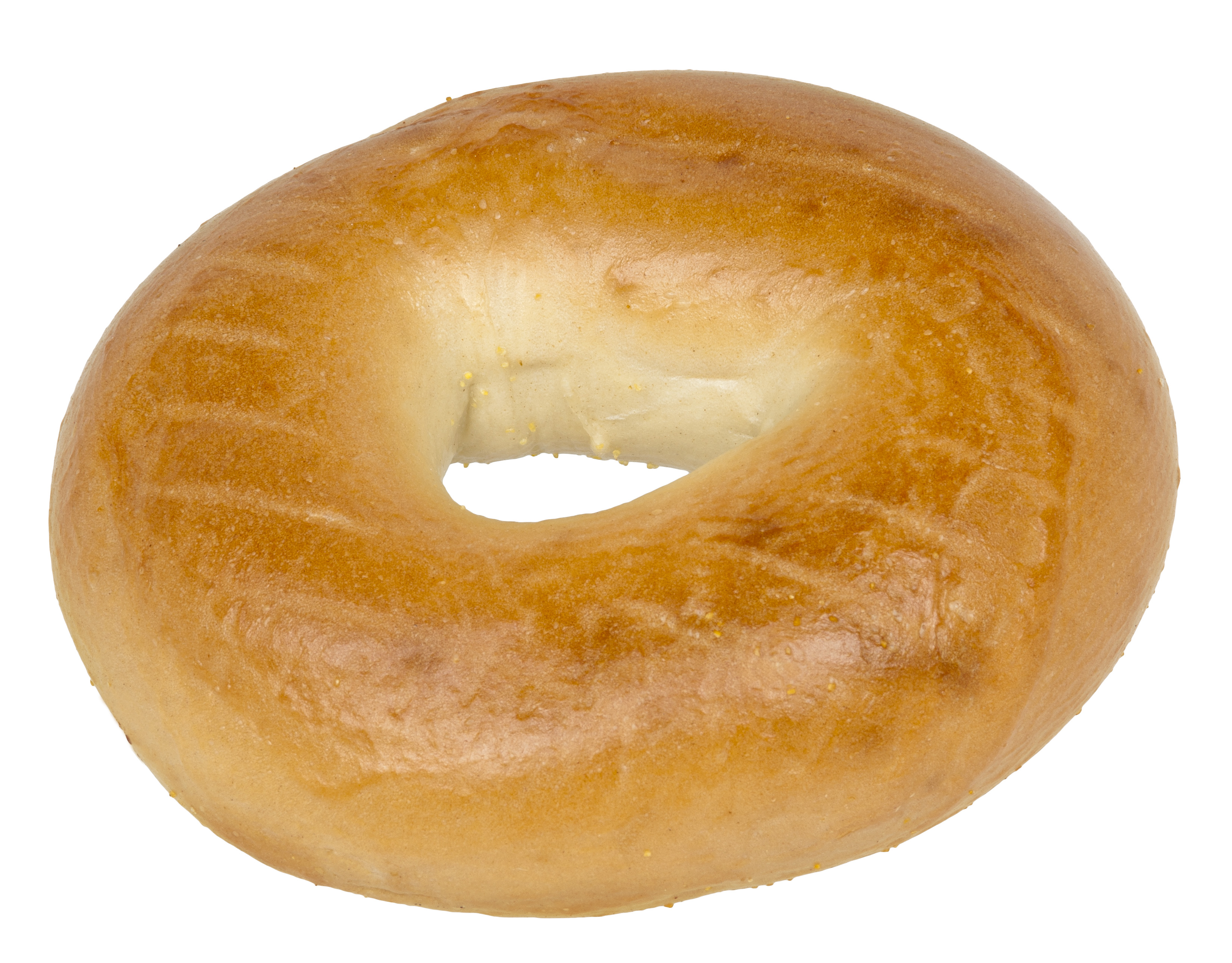
Bagels originated in Poland and became widespread after the migration of Polish Jews to the United States.

Polish cuisine (Polish: kuchnia polska, pronounced [ˈkux.ɲa ˈpɔl.ska]) is a style of food preparation from Poland. A dish cooked in the Polish fashion is denoted by the term à la polonaise. (Note: The term is derived from French and translates as "in the Polish style", for example sauce à la polonaise.) It evolved over the centuries to be eclectic, shaped by ten centuries of regional agricultural practices, historical trade routes, religious observance, and cultural exchange. It is rich in meat, especially pork, chicken and game, in addition to a wide range of vegetables, legume, grains, mushrooms as well as herbs, and makes extensive use of butter, cream, eggs, and seasoning.

Among popular Polish national dishes are bigos [ˈbiɡɔs], pierogi [pʲɛˈrɔɡʲi], kiełbasa, kotlet schabowy [ˈkɔtlɛt sxaˈbɔvɨ] (pork loin breaded cutlet), gołąbki [ɡɔˈwɔ̃pkʲi] (stuffed cabbage leaves), zrazy [ˈzrazɨ] (roulade), zupa ogórkowa [ˈzupa ɔɡurˈkɔva] (sour cucumber soup), zupa grzybowa [ˈzupa ɡʐɨˈbɔva] (mushroom soup), zupa pomidorowa [ˈzupa pɔmidɔˈrɔva] (tomato soup), rosół [ˈrɔsuw] (meat broth), żurek [ˈʐurɛk] (sour rye soup), flaki [ˈflakʲi] (tripe soup), and red beetroot soup barszcz [barʂt͡ʂ]. Traditional dishes often demand lengthy preparation. Many Poles take time to serve and enjoy their festive meals, especially Christmas Eve dinner (Wigilia) on December 24, or Easter breakfast, both of which could take several days to prepare.

A traditional Polish dinner is composed of three courses, beginning with a soup such as rosół broth or tomato soup. In restaurants, soups can be followed by an appetizer such as herring (prepared with either cream, oil, or in aspic), or other cured meats and chopped raw vegetable salads. The main course usually includes meat, such as a roast, breaded pork cutlet, or chicken, with a coleslaw-like surówka ([suˈrufka]), shredded root vegetables with lemon and sugar (carrot, celeriac, cooked beetroot), sauerkraut, or mizeria salad. The side dishes are usually boiled potatoes, kasza, or less commonly, rice. Meals often conclude with a dessert of either a fruit compote, makowiec, a poppy seed pastry, napoleonka mille-feuille, or sernik (cheesecake).

Internationally, if a Polish culinary tradition is used in other cuisines, it is referred to as à la polonaise, from the French, meaning 'Polish-style.' In French cuisine, this term is used for techniques like using butter instead of cooking oil; frying vegetables with buttered breadcrumbs; using minced parsley and boiled eggs (Polonaise garnish); and adding horseradish, lemon juice, or sour cream to sauces like velouté.

== History ==
=== Middle Ages ===
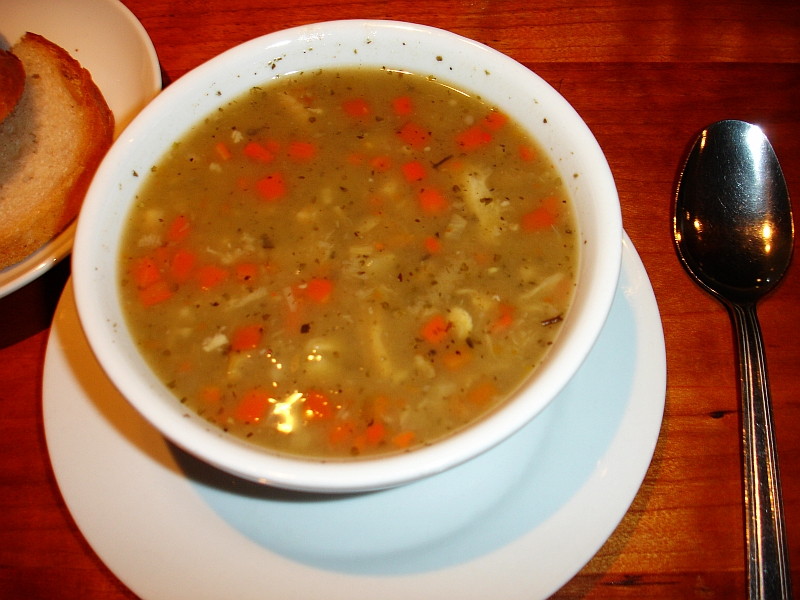
Flaki, or flaczki, a tripe soup known since the Middle Ages and the favourite dish of king Władysław II Jagiełło (Jogaila).

Polish cuisine in the Middle Ages was based on dishes made of agricultural produce and cereal crops (millet, rye, wheat), meats of wild and farm animals, fruits, forest fungi, berries and game, honey, herbs, and local spices. It was known above all for abundant use of salt from Wieliczka Salt Mine and consistent presence of groats (kasza). A high calorific value of dishes and drinking beer or mead as a basic drink was typical of Middle Ages Polish cuisine.

During the Middle Ages Polish cuisine was heavy and spicy. Two main ingredients were meat (both game and beef) and cereal. The latter consisted initially of proso millet, but in the Late Middle Ages other types of cereal became widely used. Most country people did not eat bread but consumed cereals in the form of kasza or various types of flatbread. Some of these (for instance kołacz) are considered traditional recipes even in the 21st century. Apart from cereals, a large portion of the daily diet of medieval Poles consisted of pulses, mostly broad beans and peas. As the territory of Poland was densely forested, usage of fungi, forest berries, nuts, and wild honey was also widespread. Among the delicacies of the Polish nobility were honey-braised bear paws served with horseradish-flavoured salad, smoked bear tongue, and bear bacon (bears are now protected in Poland).

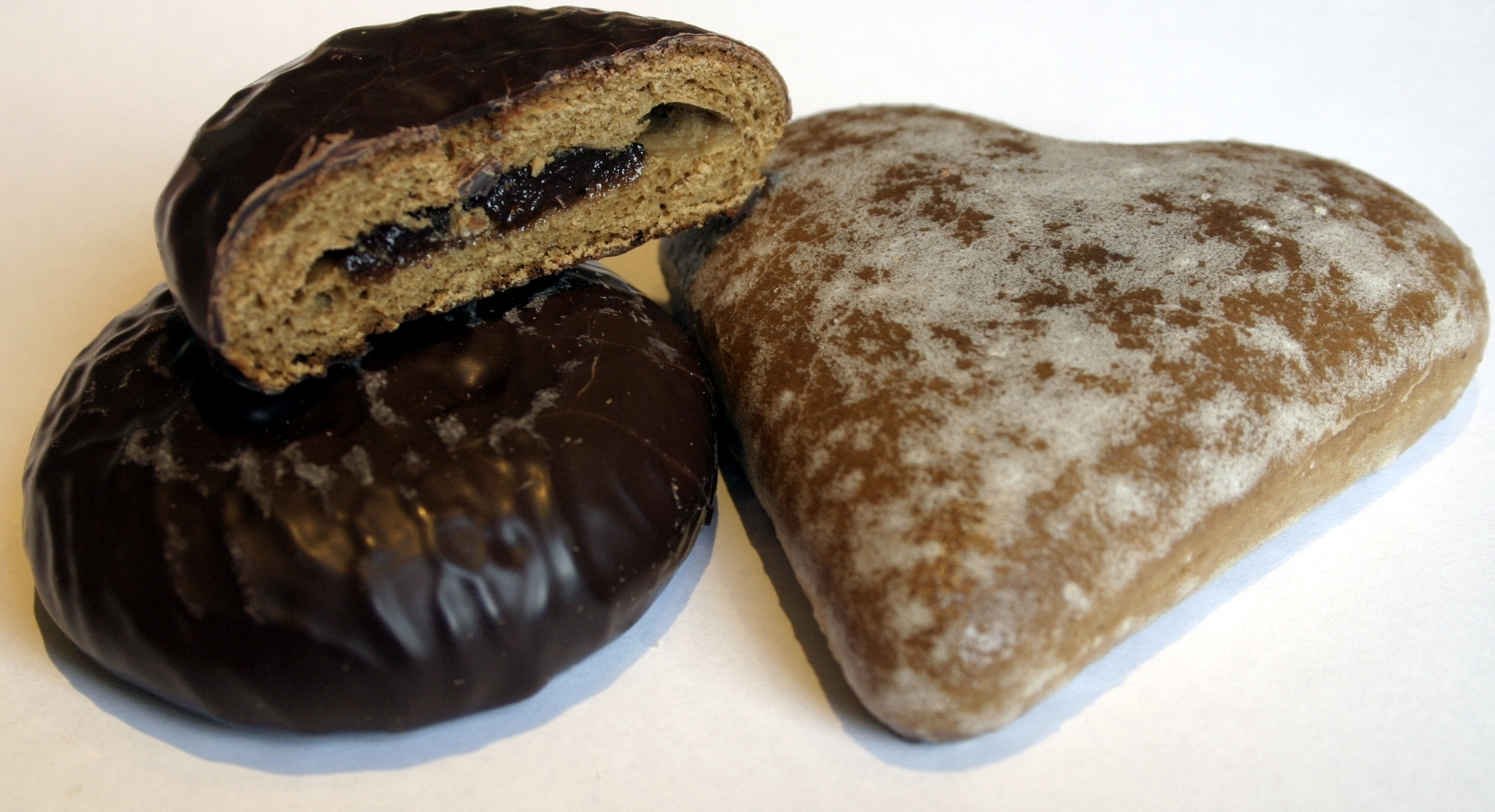
Pierniki (Polish gingerbread) from Toruń, 14th-century recipe

Owing to close trade relations with Turkey and the countries in the Caucasus, the price of spices (such as black pepper and nutmeg) was much lower in Poland than the rest of Europe, hence spicy sauces became popular. The usage of two basic sauces, the jucha czerwoná and jucha szará (meaning "red" and "gray blood" in Old Polish), remained widespread at least until the 18th century.

Daily beverages included milk, whey, buttermilk and various herbal infusions. The most popular alcoholic beverages were beer and mead; however, in the 16th century, upper classes began to import Hungarian and Silesian wines. Mead was so widespread that in the 13th century Prince Leszek I the White explained to the Pope that Polish knights could not participate in a crusade as there was no mead in the Holy Land. Also, vodka became popular, possibly among the lower classes first. There is written evidence suggesting that vodka originated in Poland. The word "vodka" was recorded for the first time ever in 1405 in Akta Grodzkie, the court documents from the Palatinate of Sandomierz in Poland. At that time, the word wódka (vodka) referred to chemical compounds such as medicines and cosmetic cleansers, while the popular beverage was called gorzałka [ɡɔˈʐawka] (from the Old Polish gorzeć).

=== Renaissance ===
The Italian-born Queen Bona Sforza (second wife of Sigismund I of Poland), brought Italian cooks with her court to Poland after 1518. Although native vegetable foods were an ancient and intrinsic part of Polish cuisine, there began a period in which vegetables like lettuce, leeks, celeriac, cabbage, carrots, onions (cipolla/cebula) and especially, tomatoes (pomo d'oro/pomidory), were introduced. Even today, some of those vegetables are referred to in Polish as włoszczyzna, a word derived from Włochy, the Polish name of Italy. During this period, the use of spices — which arrived in Poland via Western Asian trade routes was common among those who could afford them, and dishes considered elegant could be very spicy. However, the idea that Queen Bona was the first to introduce vegetables to Poland is false. While her southern cooks may have helped elevate and expand the role of various vegetables in royal Polish cuisine, records show that the court of king Jogaila (Polish: Władysław II Jagiełło, who died in 1434, over 80 years before her reign) enjoyed a variety of vegetables including lettuce, beets, cabbage, turnip, carrots, peas, and cauliflower.

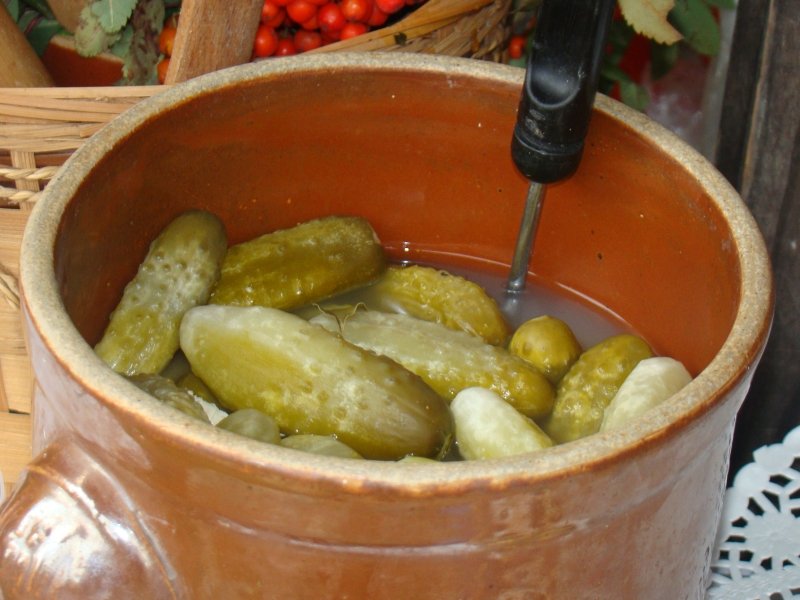
Ogórki kiszone (brine-pickled cucumbers)

Polish-style pickled cucumber (ogórek kiszony) is a variety developed in the northern part of Central Europe. It was exported worldwide and is found in the cuisines of many countries. It is usually preserved in wooden barrels. A cucumber only pickled for a few days is different in taste (less sour) than one pickled for a longer time and is called ogórek małosolny (lit. 'lightly salted gherkin'). Another kind of pickled gherkin popular in Poland is ogórek konserwowy (lit. 'preserved gherkin'), which is preserved with vinegar rather than pickled and uses different spices creating a sweet and sour taste, and well known in Jewish cuisine.

The court of Queen Bona followed the Italian fashion, because she exclusively employed Italian chefs, some of whom were originally hired to prepare parties for aristocratic families but who were soon serving typical Italian dishes as part of the court's daily menu. Court records show that Queen Bona imported large volumes of southern European, American, and Western Asian fruits (oranges, lemons, pomegranates, olives, figs, tomatoes), vegetables (potatoes and corn), nuts (chestnuts, raisins, and almonds, including marzipan), along with grains (such as rice), cane sugar, and Italian olive oil. The court also imported various herbs and spices including black pepper, fennel, saffron, ginger, nutmeg, cloves, and cinnamon.

=== The Polish–Lithuanian Commonwealth ===
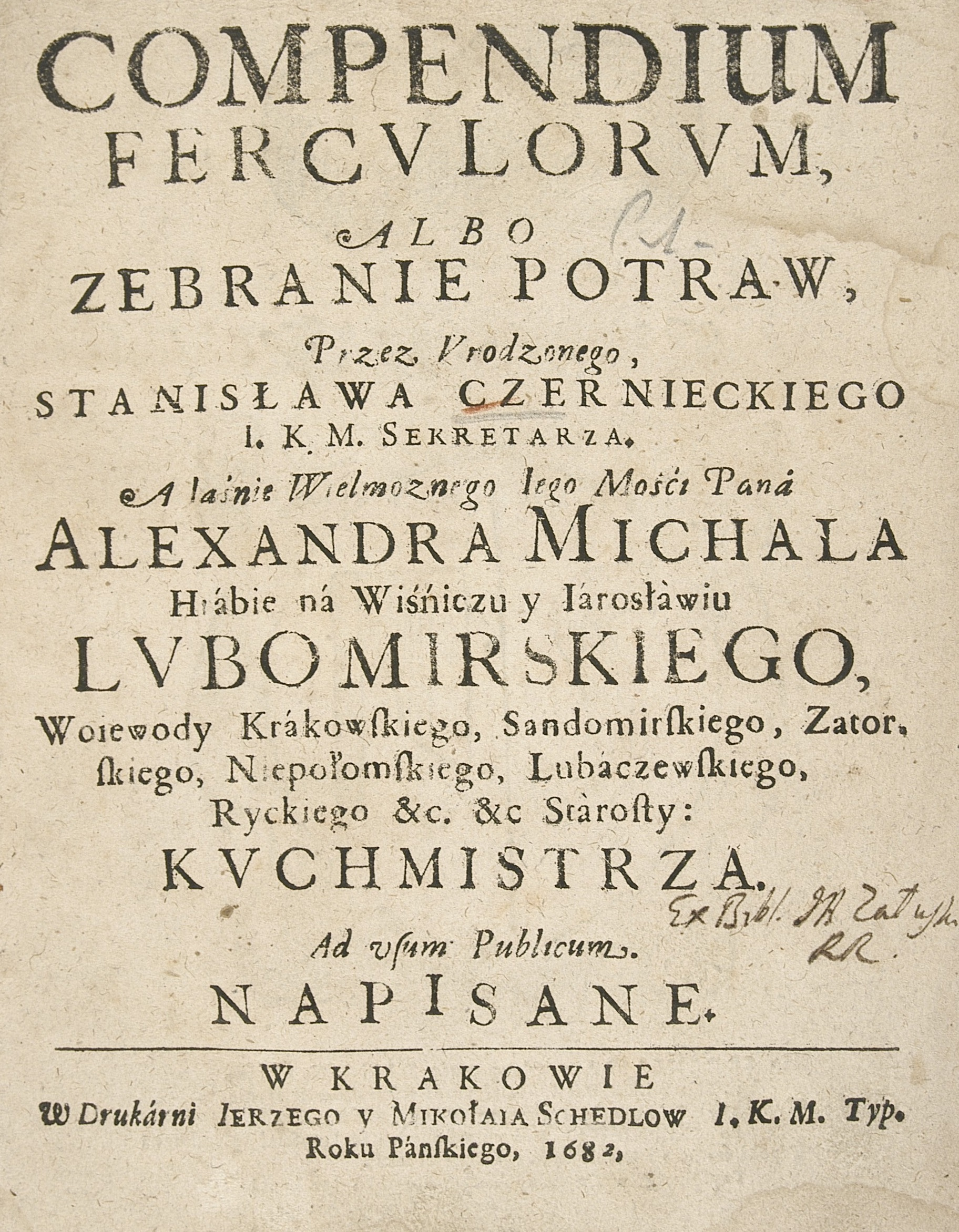
Compendium ferculorum, albo Zebranie potraw ("Collection of Dishes") is the oldest extant Polish cookbook, from 1682.

Until the Partitions perpetrated by the neighboring empires, Poland was one of the largest countries in the world, and encompassed many regions with its own, distinctive culinary traditions. Two consecutive Polish kings, Władysław IV and John II Casimir (Polish: Jan II Kazimierz Waza) married the same French Duchess, Marie Louise Gonzaga (Polish: Ludwika Maria), daughter of Charles I, Duke of Mantua; she was persecuted by King Louis XIII for her affiance to his opponent Gaston, Duke of Orléans. Marie Louise arrived in Warsaw in 1646. Ludwika brought along with her a court full of Frenchmen including courtiers, secretaries, army officers, physicians, merchants, craftsmen, as well as many cooks.

Records show that her visiting guests were entertained with game, fowl (waxwings, fieldfares, snow bunting, hazel grouse, partridges, black grouse, capercaillies), fish and mollusks (loach, various trout, grayling, fresh and smoked salmon, flounder, salted herring, lampreys in vinegar, oysters, snails), and Genoese pâté, not to mention fresh fruit and chestnuts. French and Italian wines were served, as well as mead and local beers. These dishes were made only according to French recipes. The royal court, with all its innovations, exerted a broad influence over the rest of aristocratic residences and noble palaces across Poland. French cuisine was in fashion and many families willingly employed French cooks and patissiers. In the mid-18th century, French champagne appeared on Polish tables.

Among the most influential regional cuisines under the Polish–Lithuanian Commonwealth were Lithuanian, Jewish, German, and Hungarian cuisine, as well as Armenian cuisine, which arrived in Poland before the 17th century along with many settlers, especially in the south-eastern part of the Commonwealth. Signature dishes of Western Asia reached Polish tables thanks to the Armenian trade and cultural exchange with Poland's neighbor: the Ottoman Empire. Rare delicacies were brought to royal court as gifts from sultans and royal envoys. The strongest influences were noted in the cities of Lwów, Kraków, Kamieniec Podolski, and Zamość due to many Armenians living there permanently. Also, because of the close contact with the Ottoman Empire, coffee (kawa) and boza became popular.

With the subsequent decline of Poland, and the grain crisis that followed The Swedish Deluge, potatoes began to replace the traditional use of cereals. The oldest surviving Polish cookbook, Compendium ferculorum, albo Zebranie potraw ("Collection of Dishes") by Stanisław Czerniecki was published in Kraków in 1682. Under the Partitions, the cuisine of Poland became heavily influenced by cuisines of surrounding empires. This included Russian and German cuisines, but also the culinary traditions of most nations of the Austro-Hungarian empire. The 19th century also saw the creation of many Polish cookbooks, by Jan Szyttler, Anna Ciundziewicka, Wincenta Zawadzka, Lucyna Ćwierczakiewiczowa, and others.

=== After World War II ===
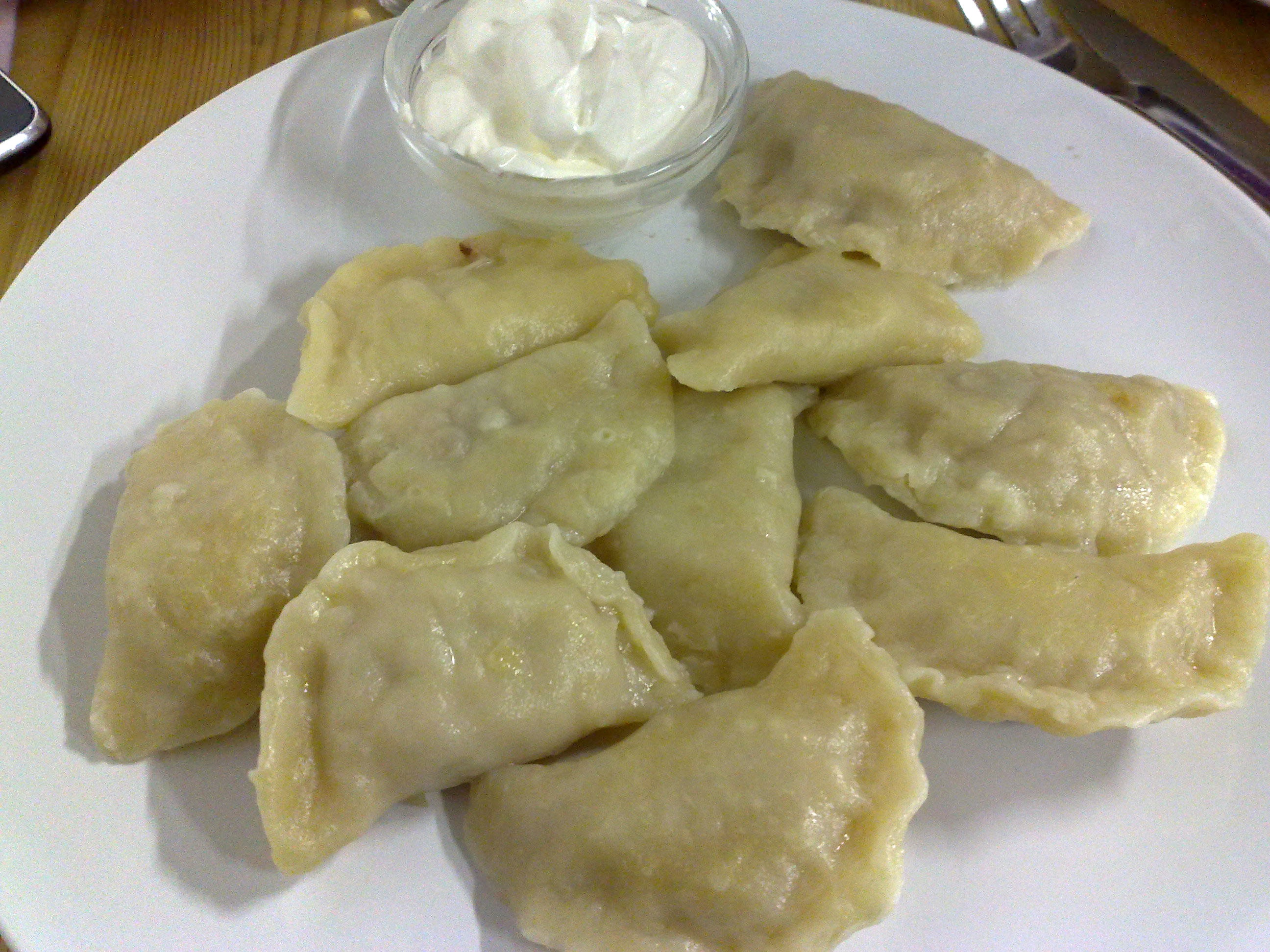
Most enduring of Polish culinary traditions are pierogi, a national dish of Poland, originating in the ancient culinary traditions of Poland's former eastern territories (Kresy).

After the end of World War II, Poland became a Communist country which joined the Warsaw Pact. Some restaurants were nationalized. The Communists envisioned a network of lunch rooms called "bufet" for the workers at various companies, and milk bars for the public. The majority of restaurants that survived the 1940s and 1950s were state-owned. Workplace canteens promoted mostly inexpensive meals, including soups, meatballs and pork chops, and staples such as placki ziemniaczane / kartoflane (potato pancakes), placki z jablkami (apple pancakes), kopytka (potato gnocchi), leniwe (farmer's cheese gnocchi served as a sweet), and pierogi. A typical second course consisted of meat cutlet served with potatoes or buckwheat and surówka (raw, julienned vegetables). The popular Polish kotlet schabowy is a breaded cutlet similar to the Austrian Wiener schnitzel and the Italian and Spanish Milanesa.

With time, the shortage economy led to scarcity of meat, coffee, tea, and other basic ingredients. Many products like chocolate, sugar, and meat were rationed, with a specific limit depending on social class and health requirements. Physical workers and pregnant women were generally entitled to more food products. Imports were restricted, so much of the food supply was domestic. Cuisine became homogeneous, to be a chef was no longer a prestigious profession, and for decades the country became basically disconnected from any foreign cuisine. Tropical fruits (such as citrus, banana, and pineapple) were available during holidays, while local fruits and vegetables were mostly seasonal but were available at private stands. For most of the year, people had to get by with only domestic winter fruit and vegetables: apples, plums, currants, onions, potatoes, cabbage, root vegetables, and frozen products. Other food products (of foreign origins) were seldom available at markets at high prices.

This situation led in turn to gradual replacement of traditional Polish cuisine with food prepared from anything available at the time. Among popular dishes introduced by public restaurants were kotlet mielony (meatballs), a sort of hamburger often served with beetroot puree and raw carrots. The traditional recipes were mostly observed during the Wigilia feast (Christmas Eve), for which many families tried to prepare 12 traditional courses.

A popular form of fish dish was, and still is, the paprikash (paprykarz szczeciński) from the port city of Szczecin, usually added to sandwiches as a spread.

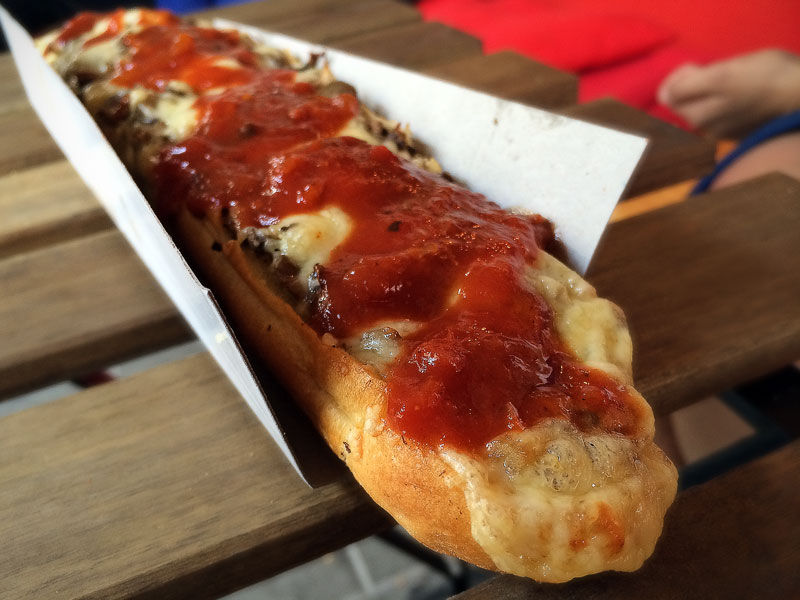
Zapiekanka, a long loaf sandwich with melted cheese, meat, mushrooms, onions, and ketchup. A popular street food to this day which originated in the 1970s.

=== Modern era ===
With the fall of communism in Poland in 1989, a wave of new restaurants opened, and basic foodstuffs were once again readily obtainable. This led to a gradual return of the rich traditional Polish cuisine, both in home cooking and in restaurants. At the same time, restaurants and supermarkets promoted the use of ingredients typical of other cuisines of the world. Among the most notable foods to become commonplace in Poland were cucurbits, zucchini, and many kinds of fish. During communist times, fresh fish was available essentially only in the seaside towns.

Recent years have seen the advent of the slow food movement, and a number of TV programmes devoted to cooking, both traditional and modern, have gained in popularity. In 2011, a nostalgic cookbook (written in English) combining a child's memories growing up in the Gierek era with traditional Polish recipes was published in London.

American fast food in Poland, often McDonald's, KFC, and Pizza Hut, are in decline as Polish people prefer their own cuisine, including fast food. Meanwhile, doner kebabs are gaining popularity. Nonetheless, in most of Poland one can still get traditional and very popular Polish street food such as the zapiekanka, a pizza-like baguette with cheese, mushrooms, onion, ketchup, and sometimes meat. There are also many small-scale, quick-service restaurants which serve kebabs, hamburgers, hot dogs, and Polish kiełbasa (sausage). In the southern mountainous region, oscypek served with cranberry jam is a popular street food.

In a 2023 survey on "100 Best Cuisines in the World" conducted by TasteAtlas, Polish cuisine was ranked 11th.

== Holiday meals ==
=== Christmas dishes ===
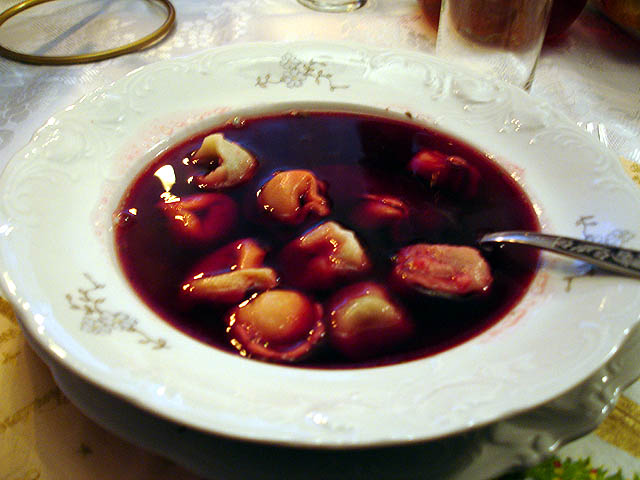
Barszcz z uszkami, one of the traditional Wigilia dishes

Traditional Christmas Eve dinner called Wigilia is meat free, though with fish and usually consists of barszcz (borscht) with uszka (small dumplings)—a classic Polish Christmas Eve starter—followed by dishes such as fried carp or cod with apple, leeks and raw salads. Traditionally, carp (fried or Jewish style) provides a main component of the Christmas Eve meal across Poland. Other popular dishes, eaten on ensuing days, include pickled matjas herring, rollmops, pierogi with sauerkraut and forest mushrooms, fish soup, kielbasa, hams, bigos (savory stew of cabbage and meat), and vegetable salads. Among popular desserts are gingerbread, cheesecake, various fruits such as oranges, poppy seed cake, makowiec (makówki in Silesia), fruit kompot, and kluski with poppyseed and gingerbread. Regional dishes include żurek, siemieniotka (in Silesia), and kołduny, stuffed dumplings with mushrooms or meat from the eastern regions.

=== Fat Thursday ===
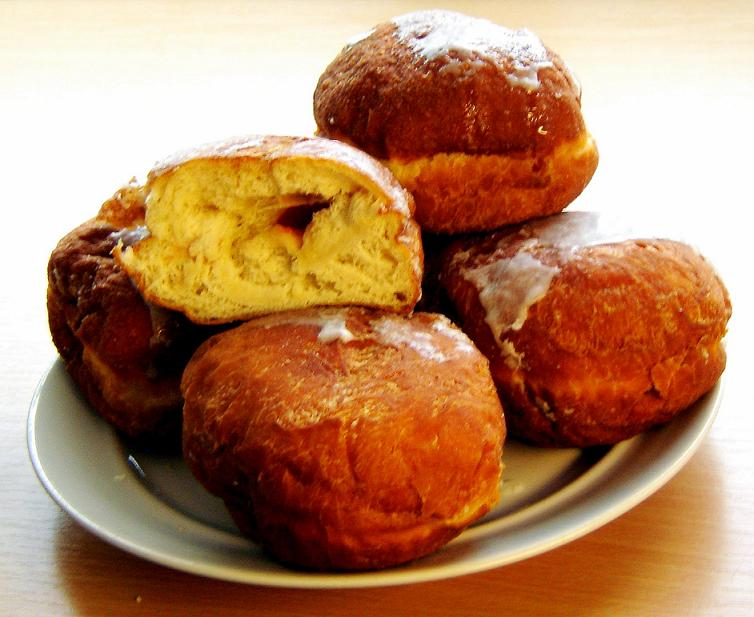
Pączki or kreple, filled doughnut

Tłusty Czwartek, or "Fat Thursday", is a Polish culinary custom on the last Thursday before Lent, equivalent to Pancake Day. Traditionally, it is an occasion to enjoy sweets and cakes before the forty days of abstinence expected of Catholics until Easter Day.

The most popular sweetmeats on 'Fat Thursday' are pączki, Polish doughnuts, and faworki (sometimes called chrust), equivalent to the French beignets. Traditional Polish doughnuts are filled with rose petal jam, plum jam, or stewed apple and covered with icing with orange peel or powdered with icing sugar. Fat Thursday used to mark the beginning of a "Fat Week", a period of great gluttony during which Polish ancestors consumed dishes served with smalec (lard), bacon, and all kinds of meat.

The original doughnuts, popular until the 16th century, were made of the same dough as bread, and would be filled with pork and fried on smalec. Only later were they made as patisserie.

=== Easter breakfast ===
A typical Easter breakfast often consists of cold-cuts served with horseradish sauce and beetroot salads, breads, bigos, żurek, kiełbasa, smoked salmon or herring, marinated vegetable salads, Easter salad (chopped boiled eggs, green peas, ćwikła, carrot, apple, potato, parsley, and mayonnaise), coffee, tea and cakes (such as chocolate cake), makowiec, mazurek, and sernik.

== Regional cuisines ==
Poland has a number of unique regional cuisines with differences in preparation and ingredients. For an extensive list of the dishes typical of Galicia, Kresy, Podlaskie, Masovia (including Warsaw), Masuria, Pomerania, Silesia, Lesser Poland, the Tatra Mountains, and Greater Poland, see the List of Polish cuisine dishes.

=== Greater Poland ===
Typical for Greater Poland are various dishes using potatoes – especially pyry z gzikiem (potatoes with quark cheese mixed with sour cream, onions and chieves). Popular are also poultry dishes like kaczka po poznańsku (duck meat with red cabbage and steam-cooked dumplings), czernina (duck blood soup) and goose meat eaten on the Saint Martin's Day.

Other famous specialities include rogale świętomarcińskie (croissants filled with white poppy seeds), fried cheese and a beer Grodziskie/Grätzer (made from oak-smoked wheat malt and with a low alcohol content).

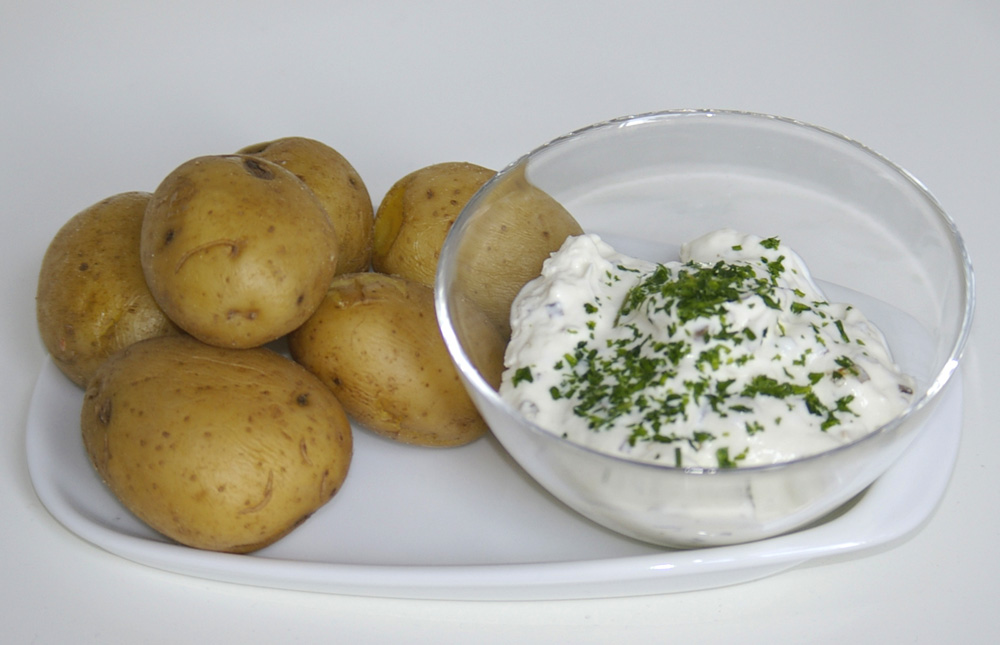
Pyry z gzikiem

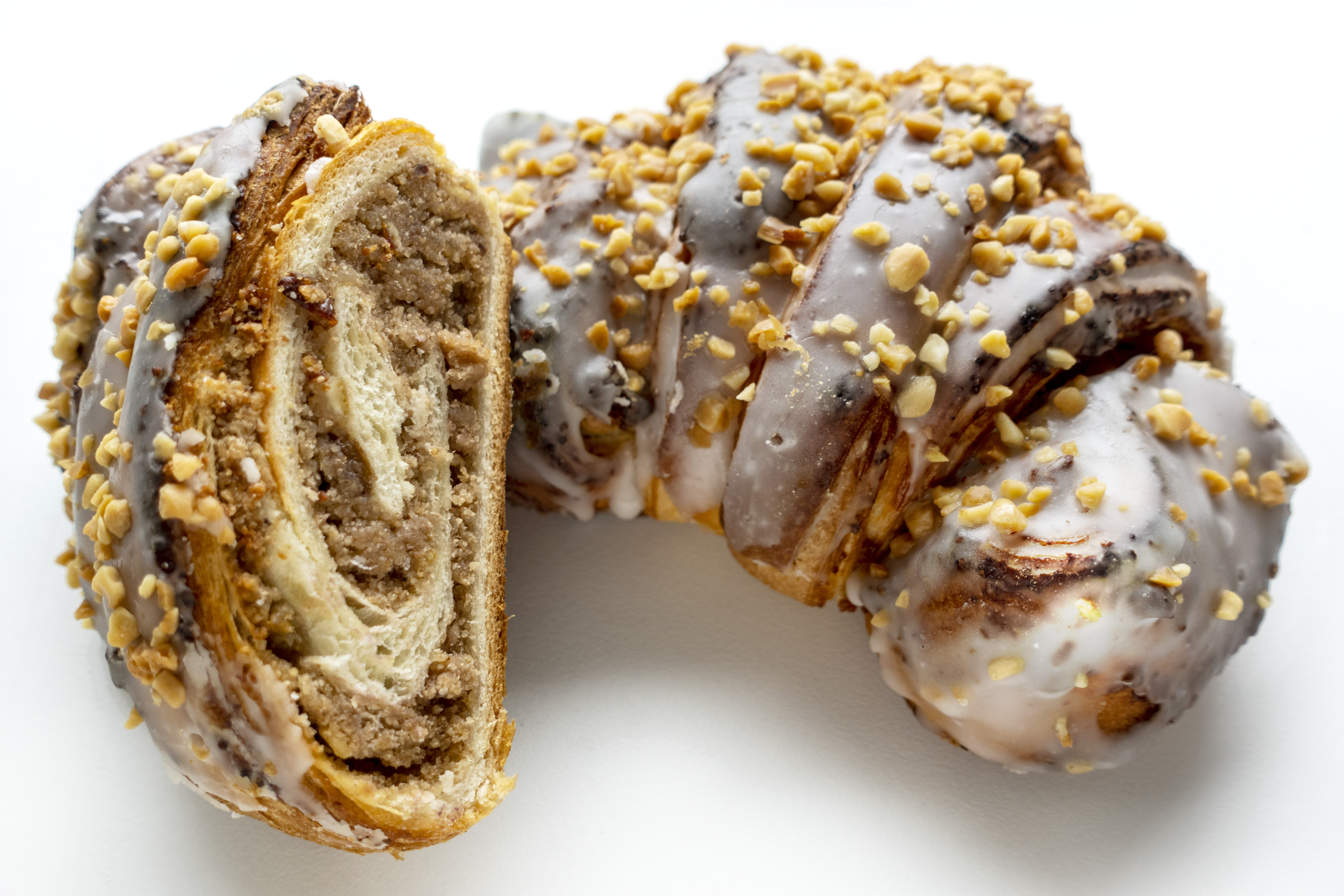
Rogal świętomarciński

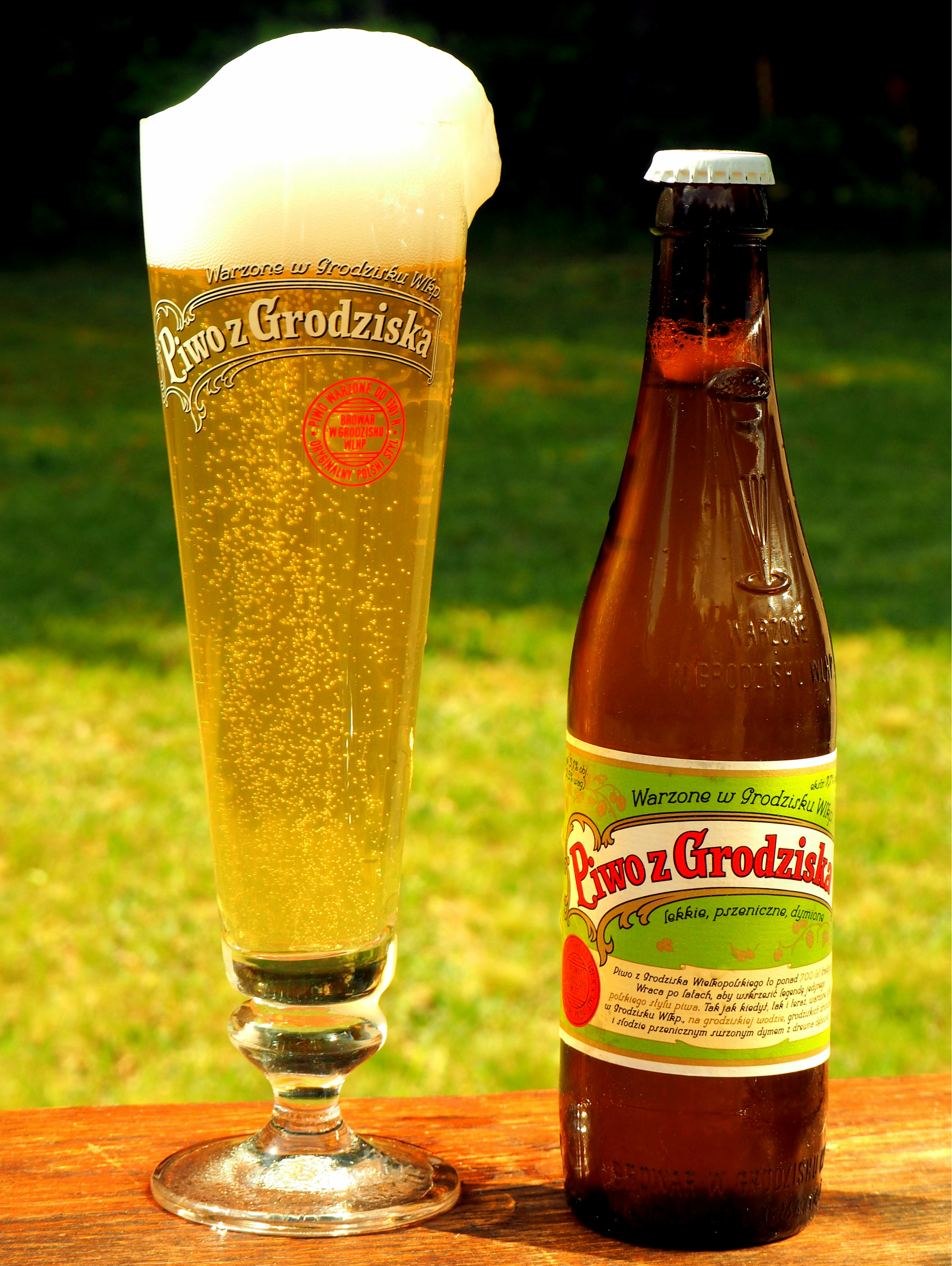
Grodziskie beer

=== Lesser Poland ===
The city of Kraków is famous for its sausage kiełbasa krakowska and meat sandwich maczanka krakowska. Typical are also some Austrian influences due to the fact, that the city belonged in the second half of the 19th century and at the beginning of the 20th century to Austria-Hungary. They include Pischinger cake and pork cutlet kotlet schabowy (today popular in the whole Poland). Popular street foods are bagels obwarzanki and baked sandwiches zapiekanki sold on the Plac Nowy square.

The area near Nowy Sącz and Limanowa is rich in quality plums; popular are prunes called suska sechlońska and plum brandy slivovitz.

The mountain areas of Lesser Poland, especially Podhale, are famous for its sheep milk cheeses like bundz, creamy bryndza or smoked oscypek. Other popular dishes include a milk drink żętyca, a sauerkraut soup kwaśnica, placek po zbójnicku (potato pancakes with goulash on top) and a góral tea (tea with alcohol).

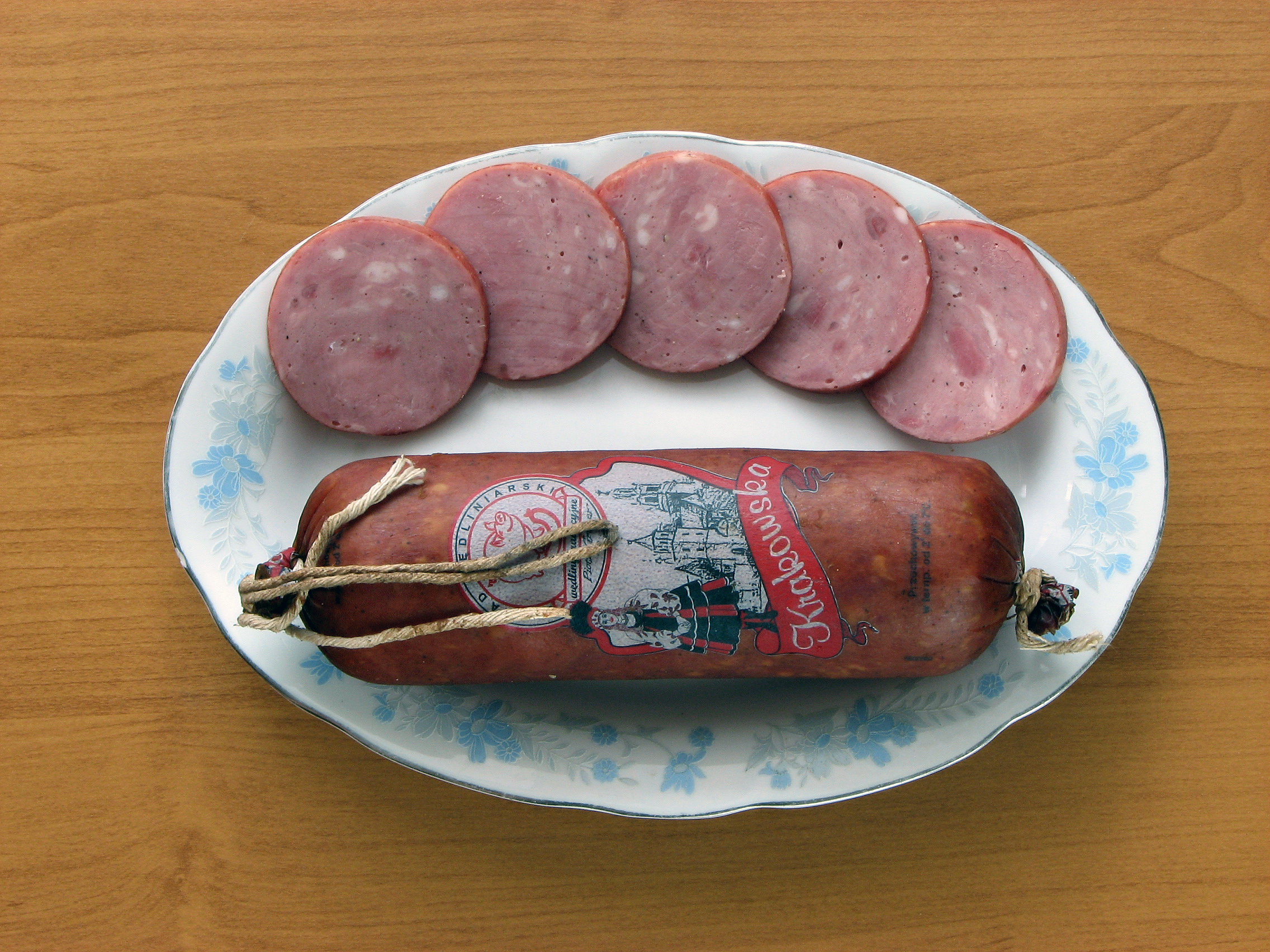
Kiełbasa krakowska

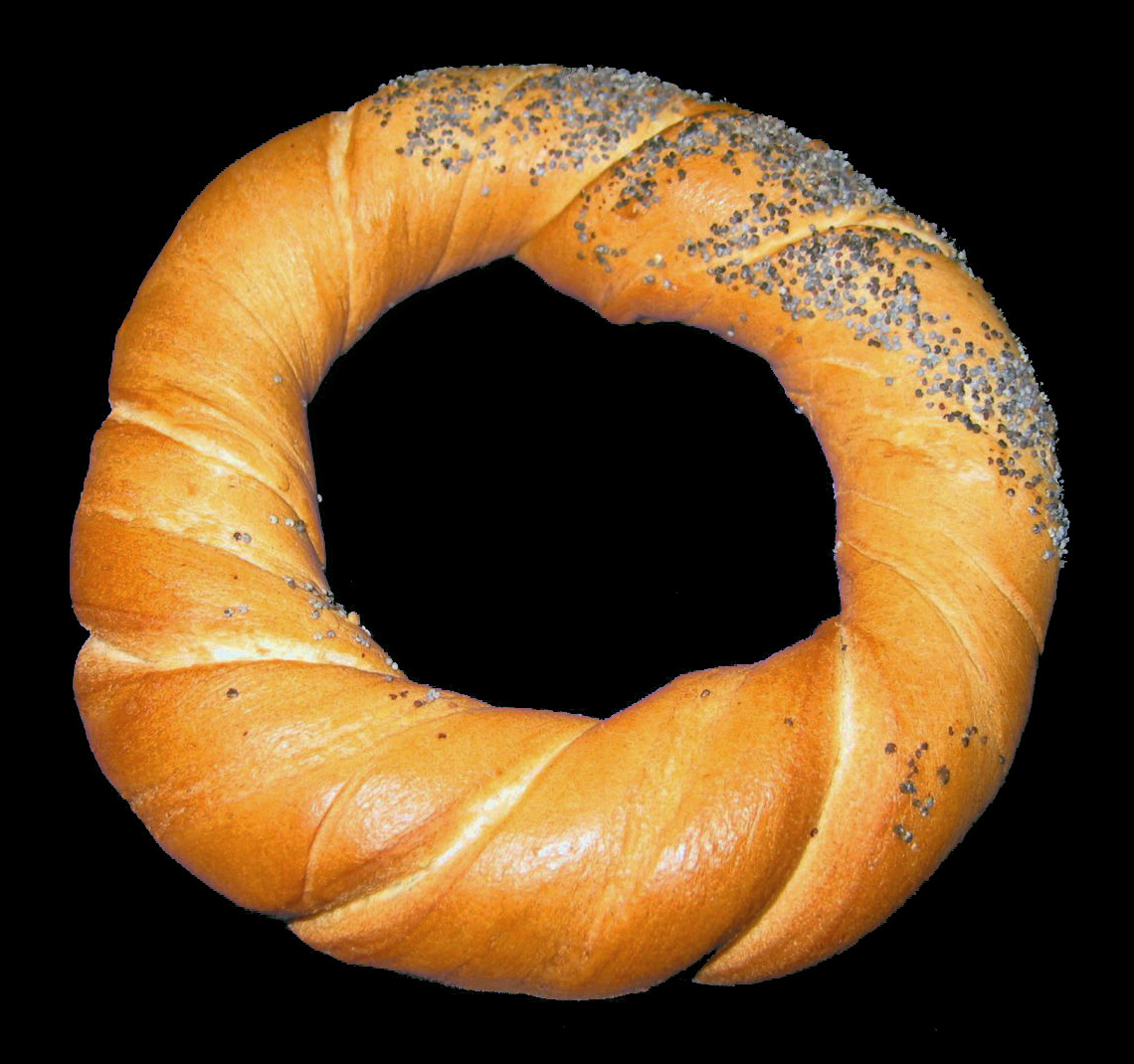
Obwarzanek krakowski

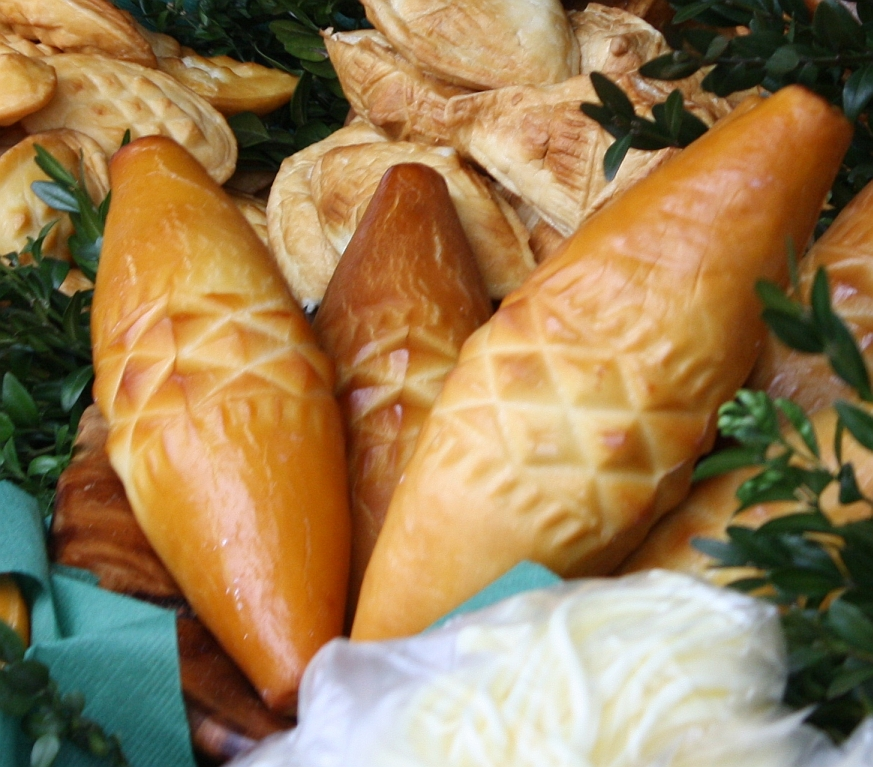
Oscypek cheese

=== Lubelszczyzna ===
Many dishes in Lublin cuisine have Jewish roots, like cebularz (flatbread topped with onion and poppy seeds) and forszmak (soup with various types of meat).

Important local ingredient is groat – typical dish consisting of it is a pie called pieróg biłgorajski.

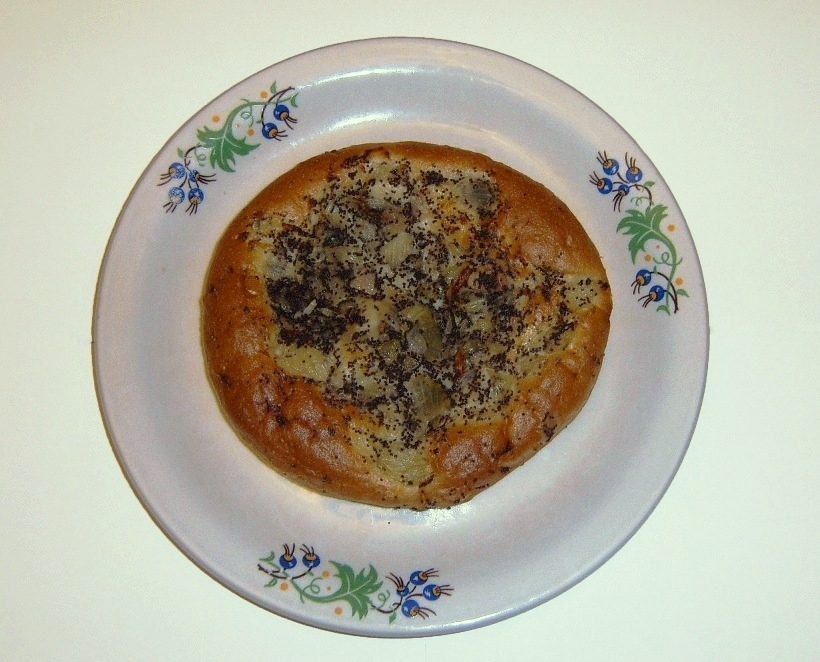
Cebularz

=== Kashubia and Pomerania ===
Because of the proximity to the sea, typical for the region are various forms of fish dishes like śledź po kaszubsku (herring in tomato marinade with onion) and fried cod or flounder.

Other famous specialties include kashubian strawberry (kaszëbskô malëna), gingerbreads from Toruń and alcohol beverages from Gdańsk: Goldwasser (herbal liqueur with flakes of gold leaf) and machandel (juniper vodka).

In Szczecin, typical regional products are paszteciki (pastries with meat or vegetarian filling) and fish spread paprykarz szczeciński. Besides, in the resort towns along the West Pomeranian Baltic coast, popular street foods are sandwiches with herring, similar to German Fischbrötchen.

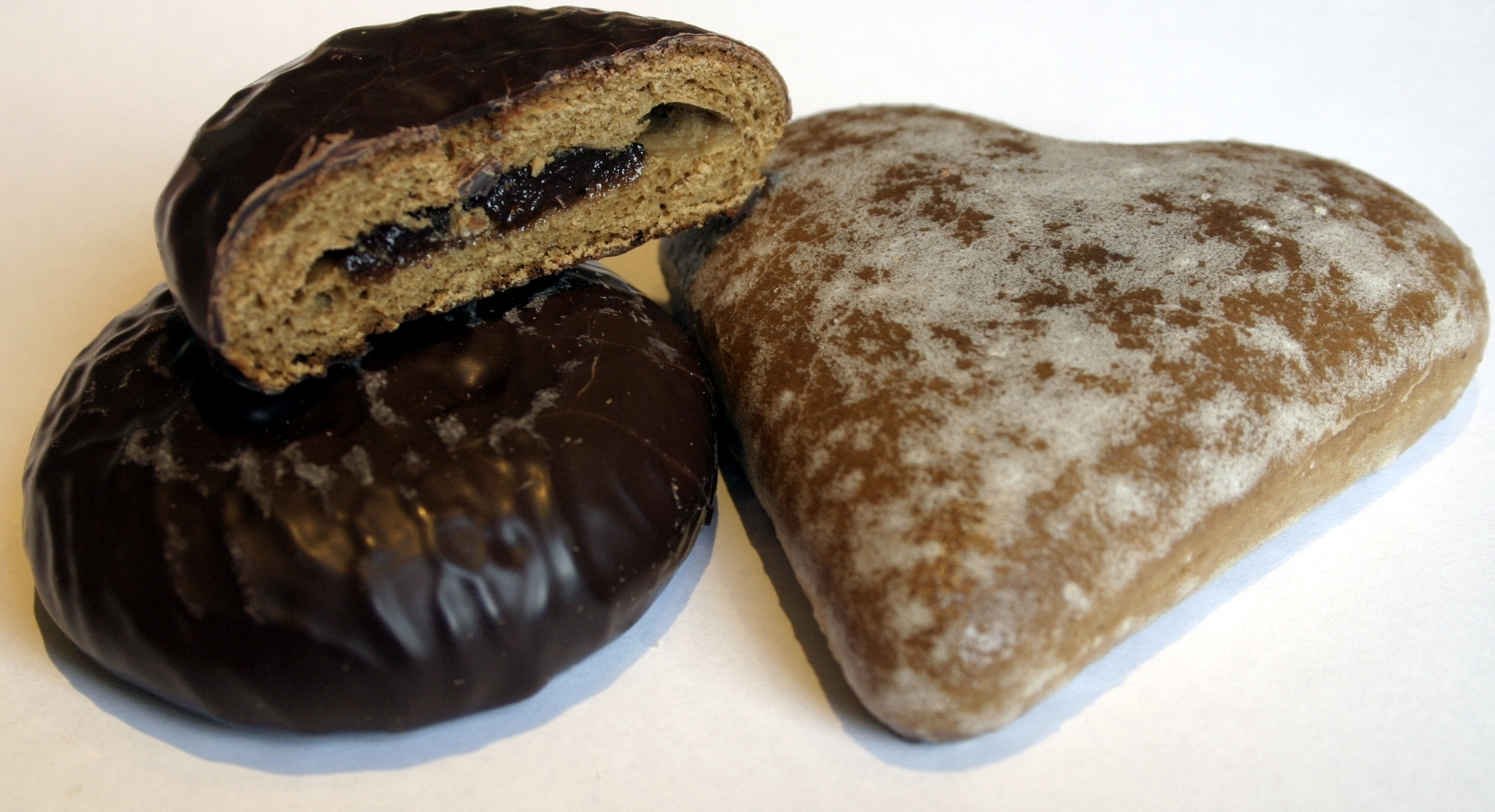
Toruń gingerbread

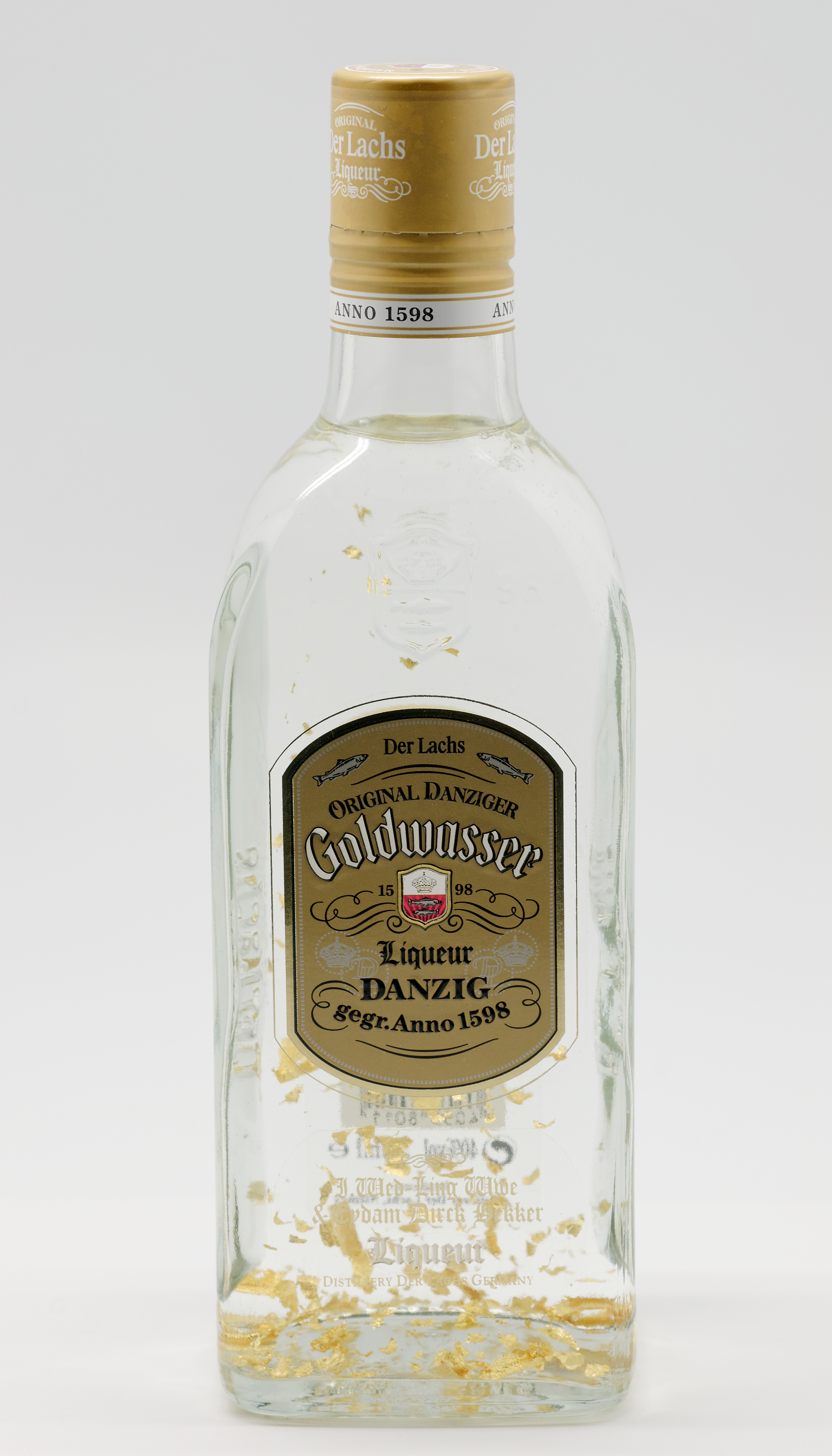
Goldwasser

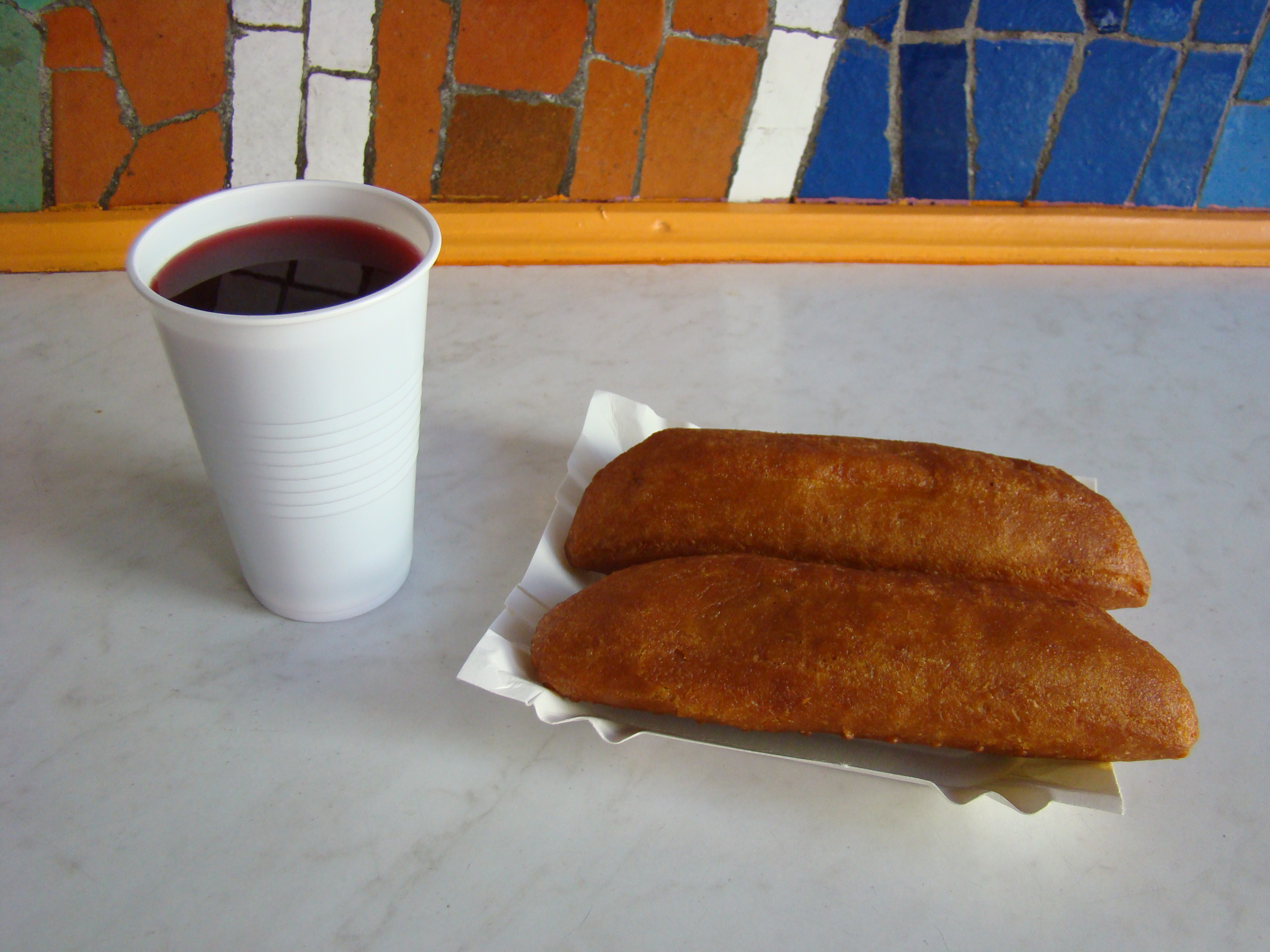
Szczecin pasztecik served with borscht

=== Masovia ===
Modern Warsaw, as a capital, has a cosmopolitan cuisine combining various international foods. However, there are also typical traditional dishes like Warsaw tripe, pyzy z mięsem (potato dumpling with meat) and pork knuckles in jelly (popular as a vodka chaser).

Famous are many desserts of Warsaw origin, like chocolate cream cake wuzetka (probably named after the Warsaw W-Z Route), ptasie mleczko (chocolate covered marshmallows) and pańska skórka (candies sold traditionally at cemeteries during the All Saints' Day).

Out of Warsaw, typical regional products include apples from Grójec and piwo kozicowe from Kurpie region (low-alcohol juniper beverage).

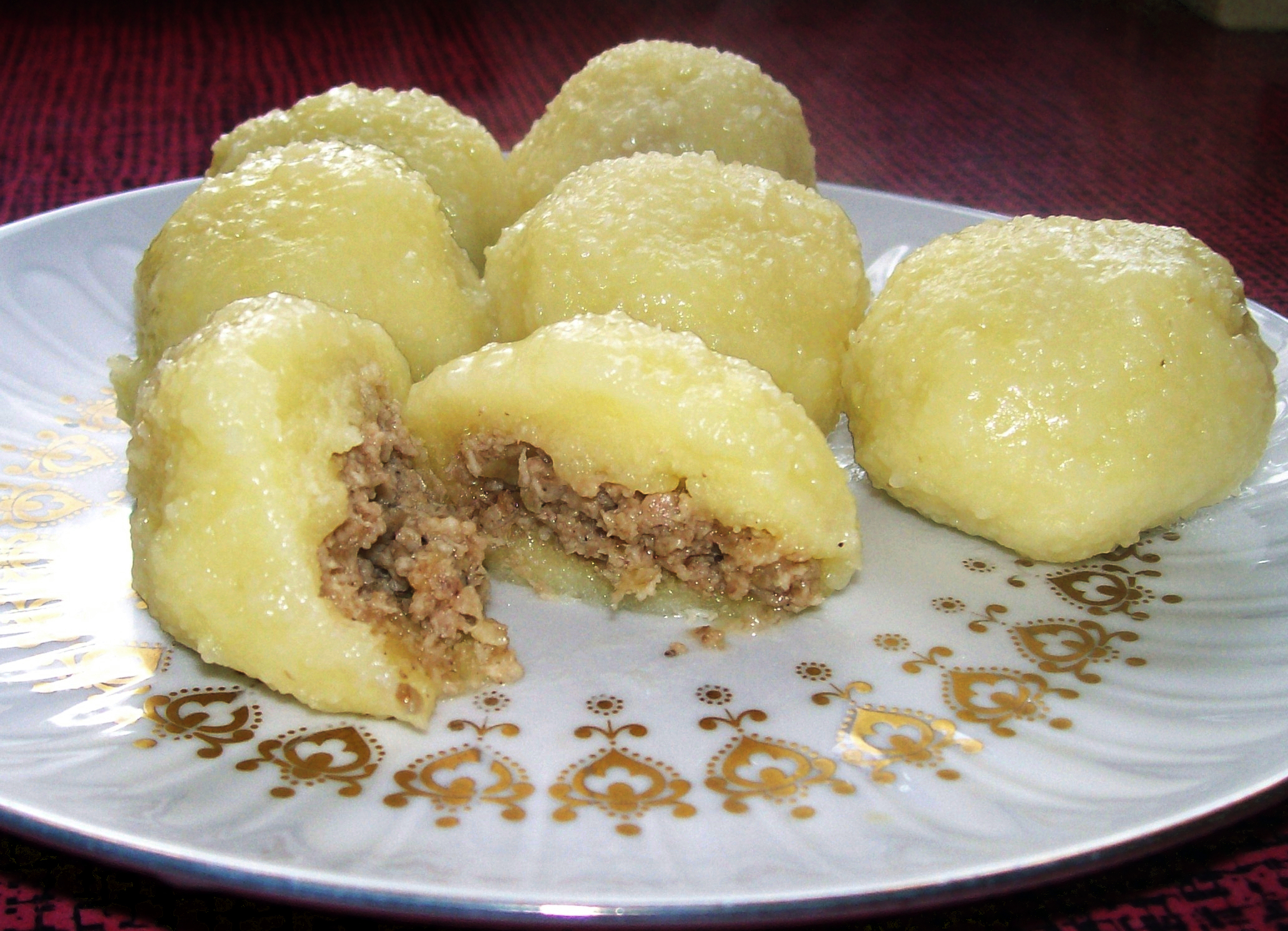
Pyzy z mięsem

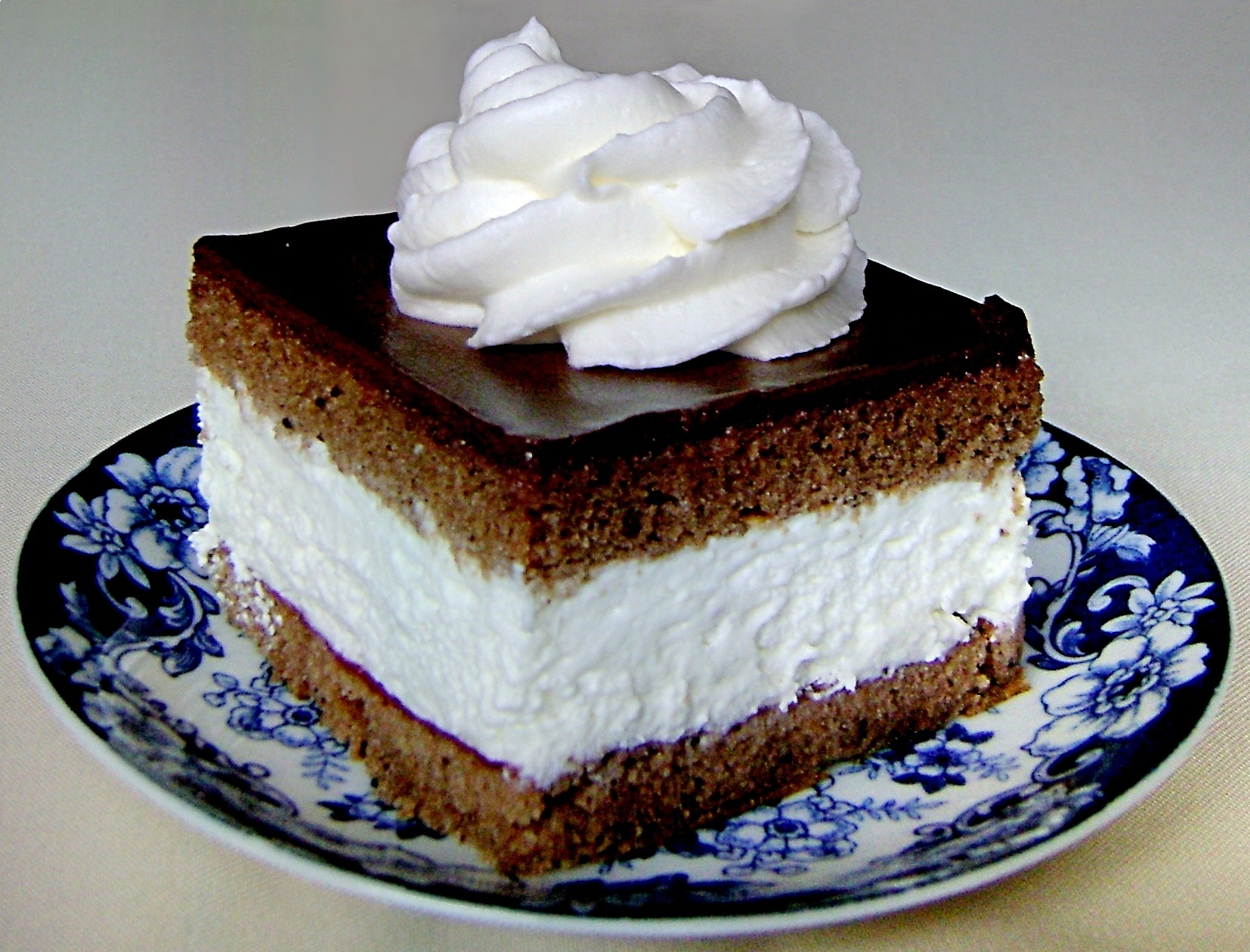
Wuzetka cake

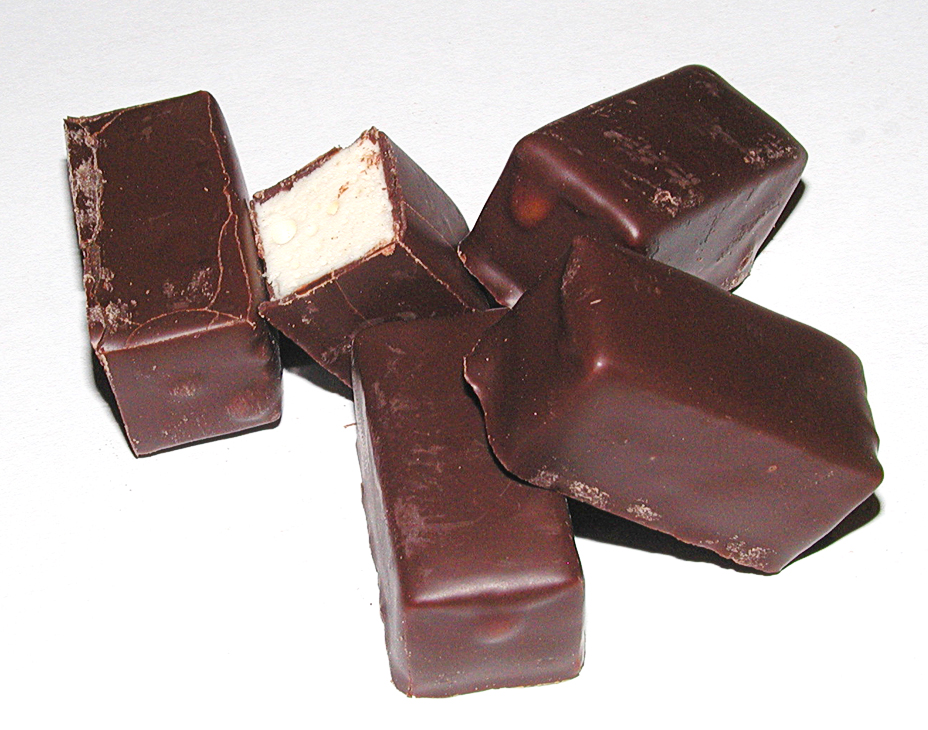
Ptasie mleczko

=== Podlaskie ===
Podlaskie cuisine has many Lithuanian, Belarusian and Tatar influences. Popular dishes, also known from the aforementioned cuisines, include kartacze (potato dumplings with meat), babka ziemniaczana (potato pie) and pierekaczewnik (meat pie).

In addition, famous are the cold beetroot or cucumber soup chłodnik, cheese koryciński and desserts: sękacz (simnal cake) and marcinek (layered cake with cream).

Podlaskie is also known from high-quality alcoholic beverages like vodka with bison grass żubrówka and home-made strong vodka duch puszczy.

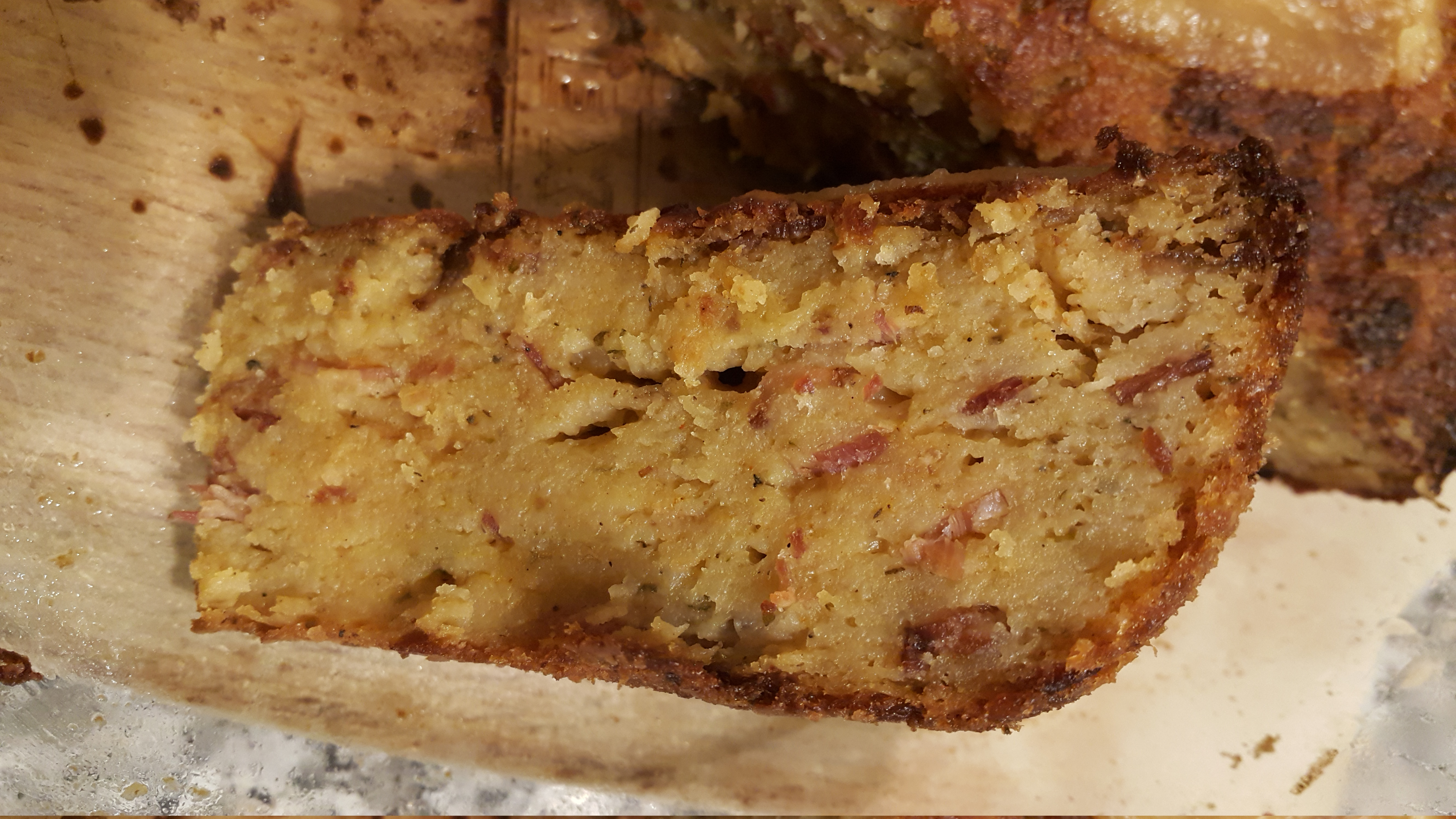
Babka ziemniaczana

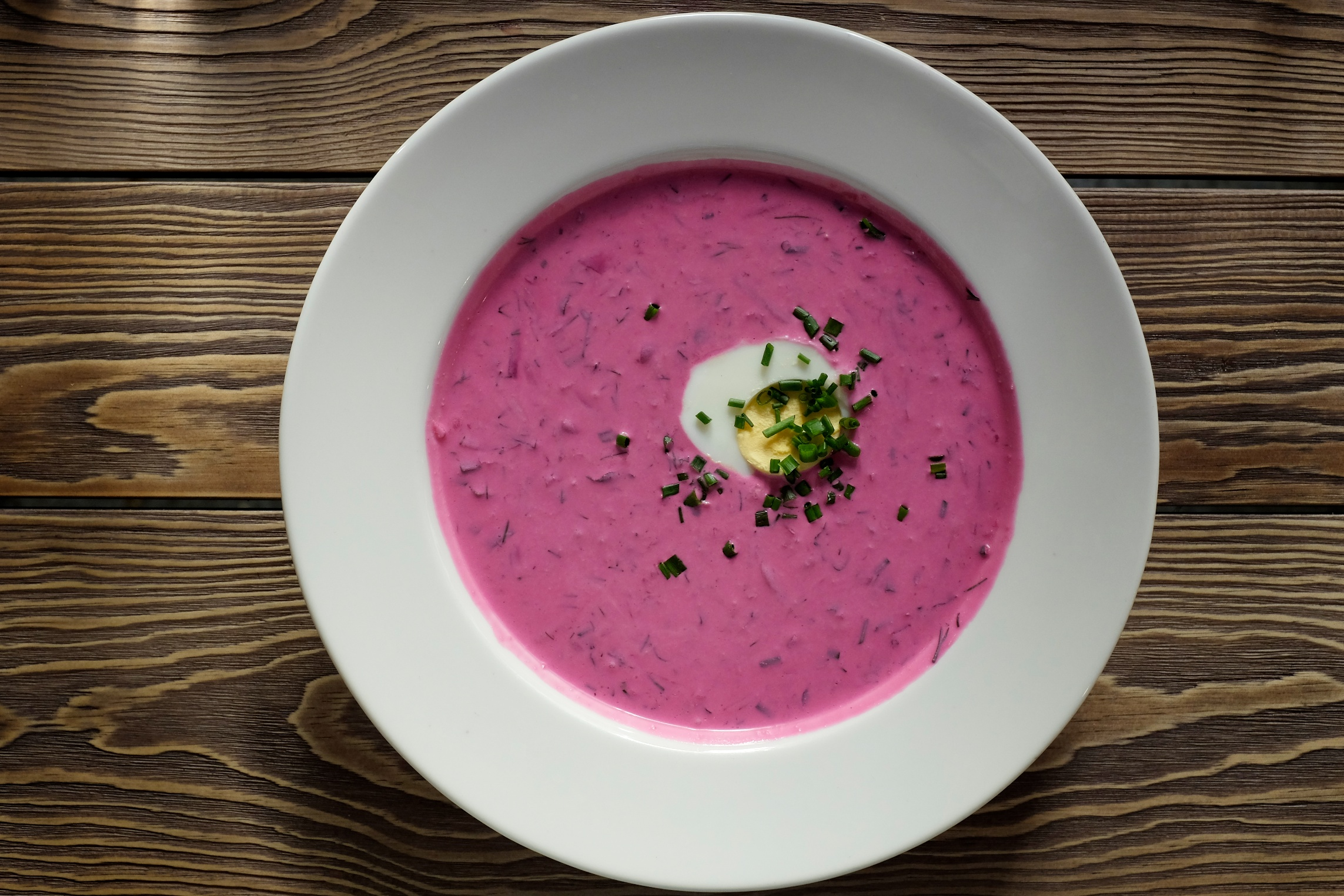
Chłodnik

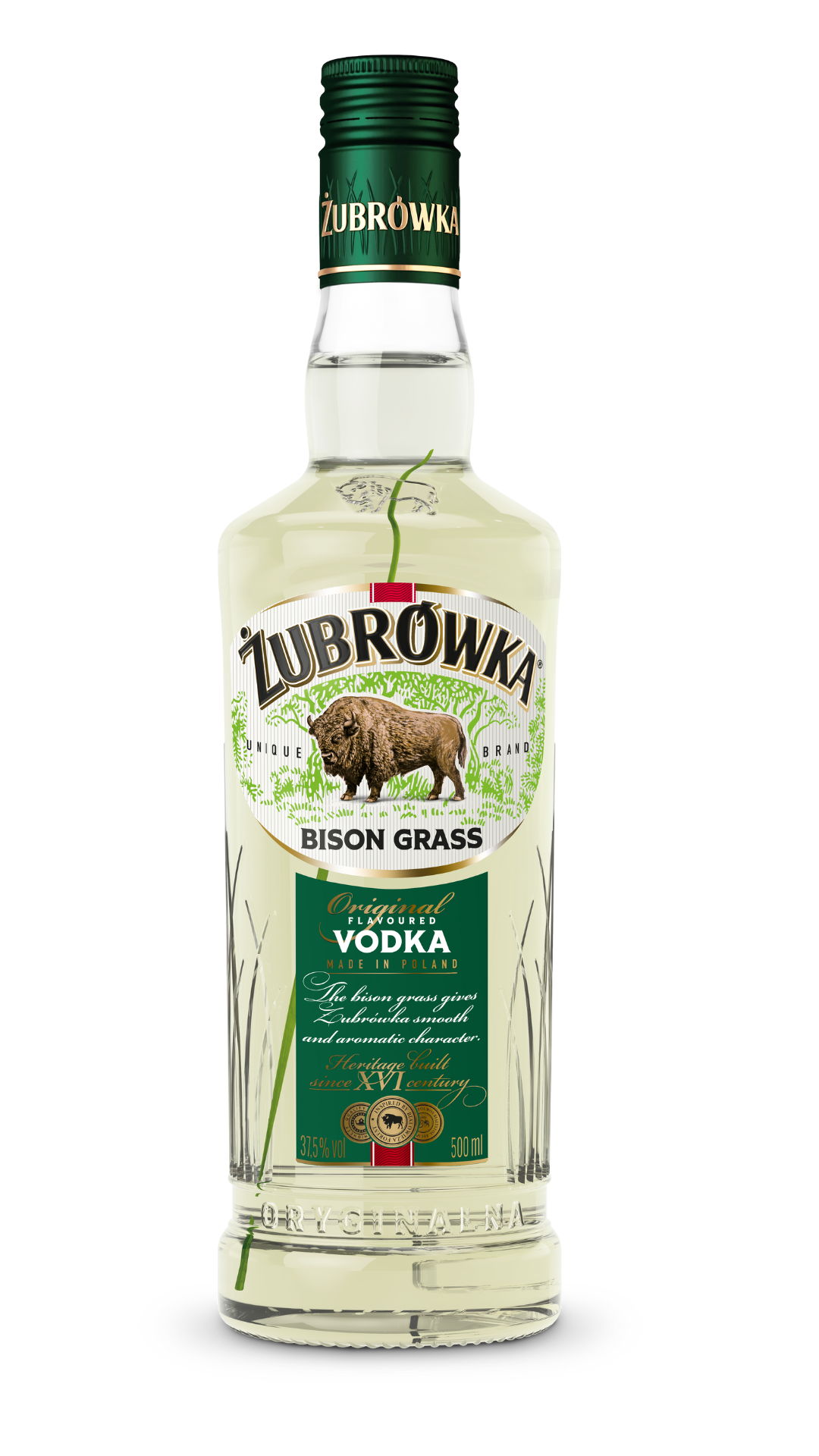
Żubrówka

=== Silesia ===
Silesian cuisine combines Polish, German, Czech and Austrian influences. The most iconic dish is rolada – rolled beef roulade usually served with Silesian dumplings and red cabbage. Other popular foods are sourdough soup żur śląski, meatballs karminadle and blood sausage krupniok.

Typical desserts are cakes like the kołocz śląski, candies kopalnioki and wafers oblaty śląskie.

Traditional dishes from Lower Silesia include śląskie niebo (pork with dried fruits and spices), gingerbread cake legnicka bomba, herbal liqueur Echt Stonsdorfer (today produced in Germany, but similar product known as Likier Karkonoski is produced in Poland) and modern fast-food from Wrocław – knysza.

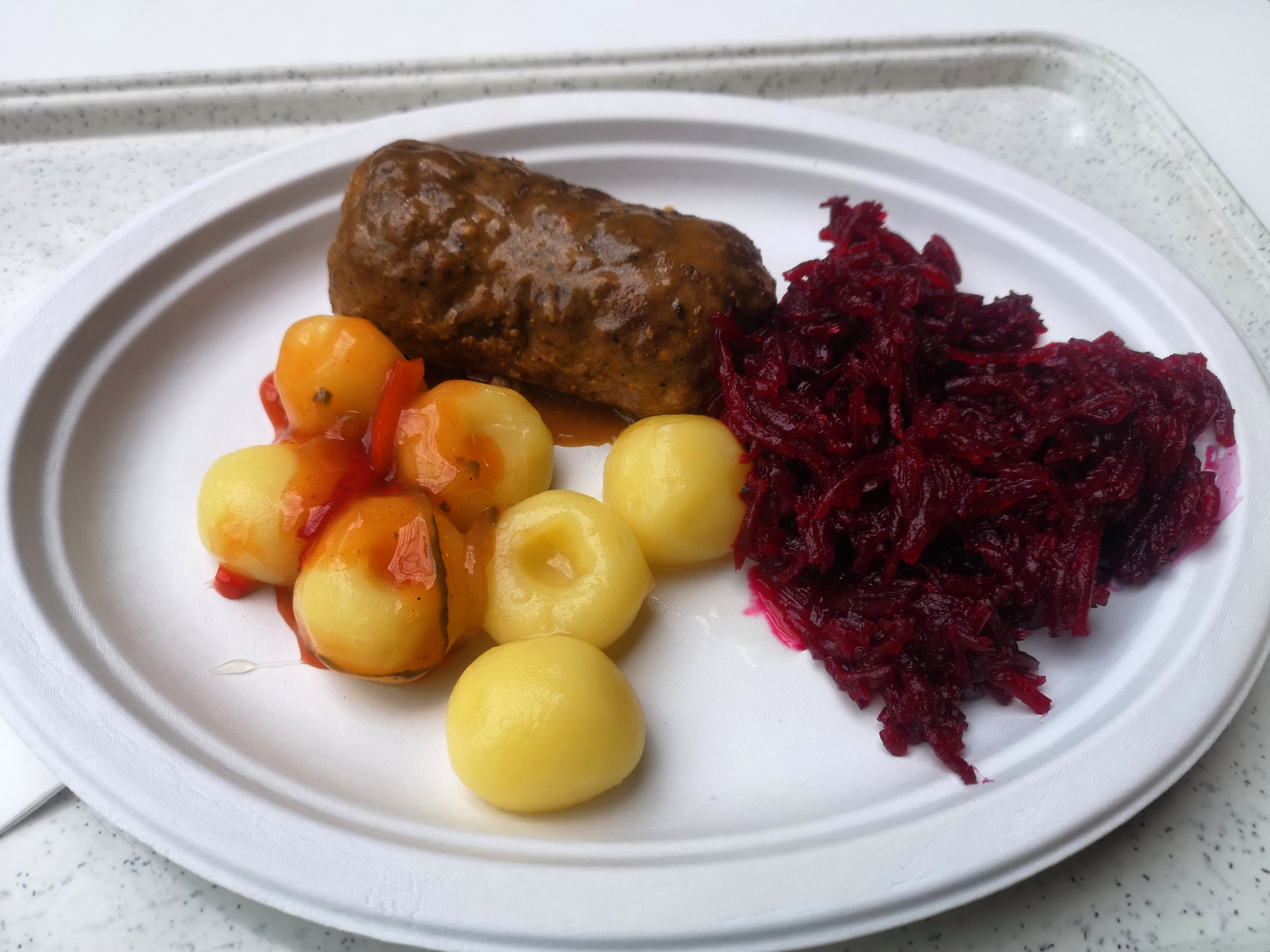
Rolada with silesian dumplings and red cabbage

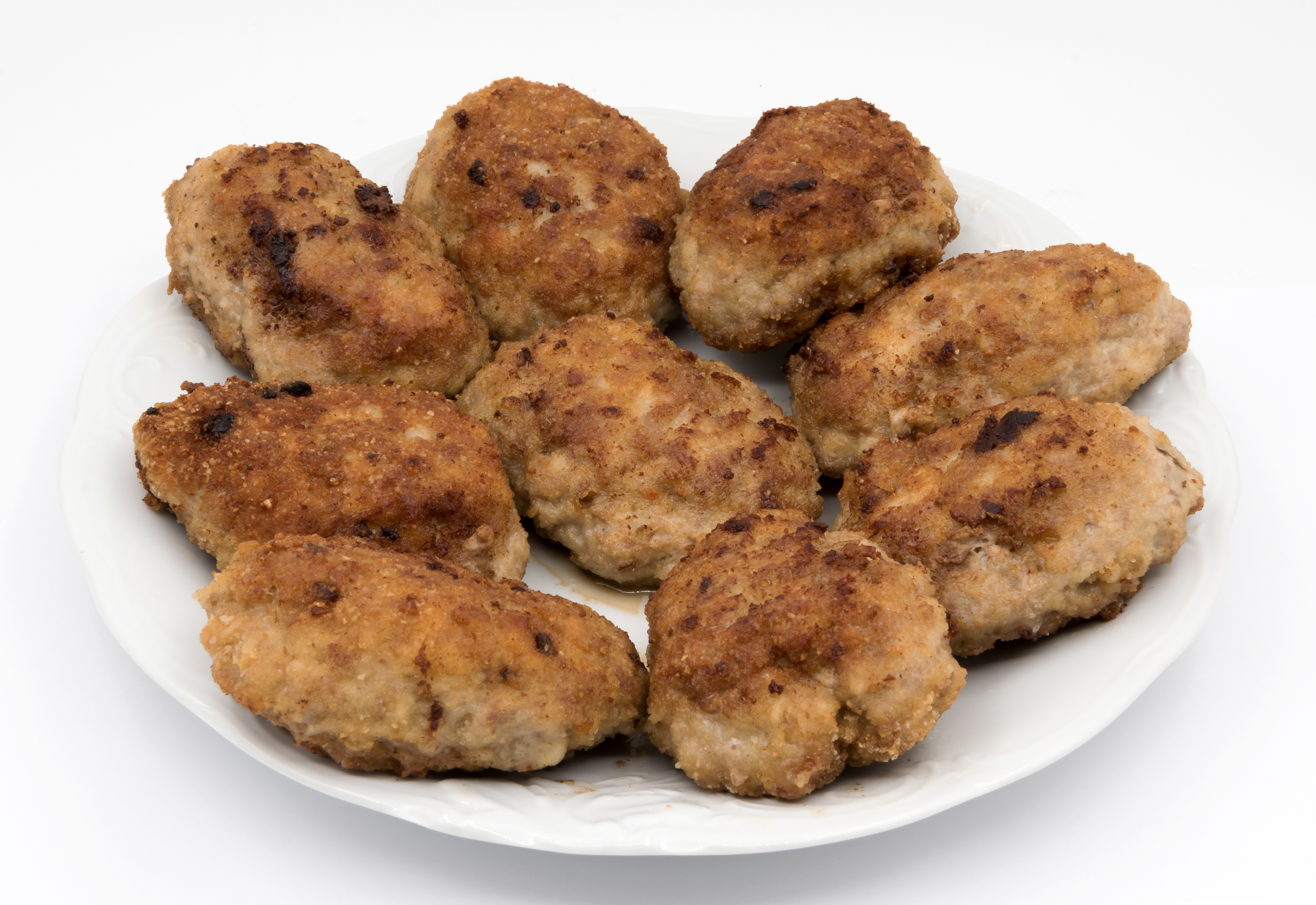
Karminadle

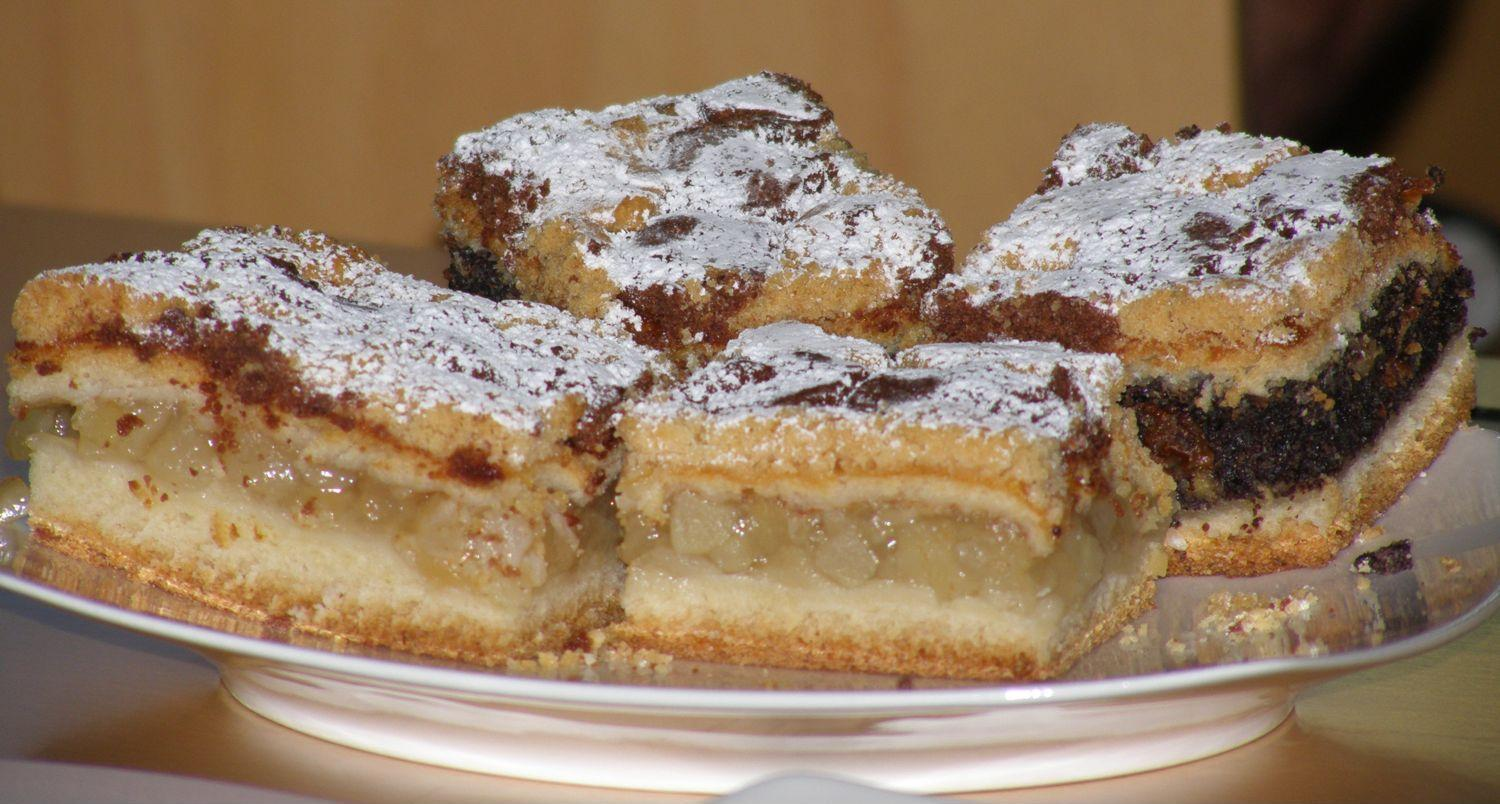
Kołocz śląski cake

=== Warmia–Masuria ===
The cuisine of Warmia–Masuria connects German and Eastern influences (especially from the former Eastern Borderlands; thus it has some similarities to the Podlaskie cuisine). Due to many lakes and forests, it is also rich in fishes, mushrooms, and honey. Typical traditional dishes include kartacze (potato dumplings with meat), dzyndzałki (dumplings filled with buckwheat groats), klopsy królewieckie (meatballs with caper sauce), sękacz (spit cake) and a honey liqueur niedźwiedziówka.

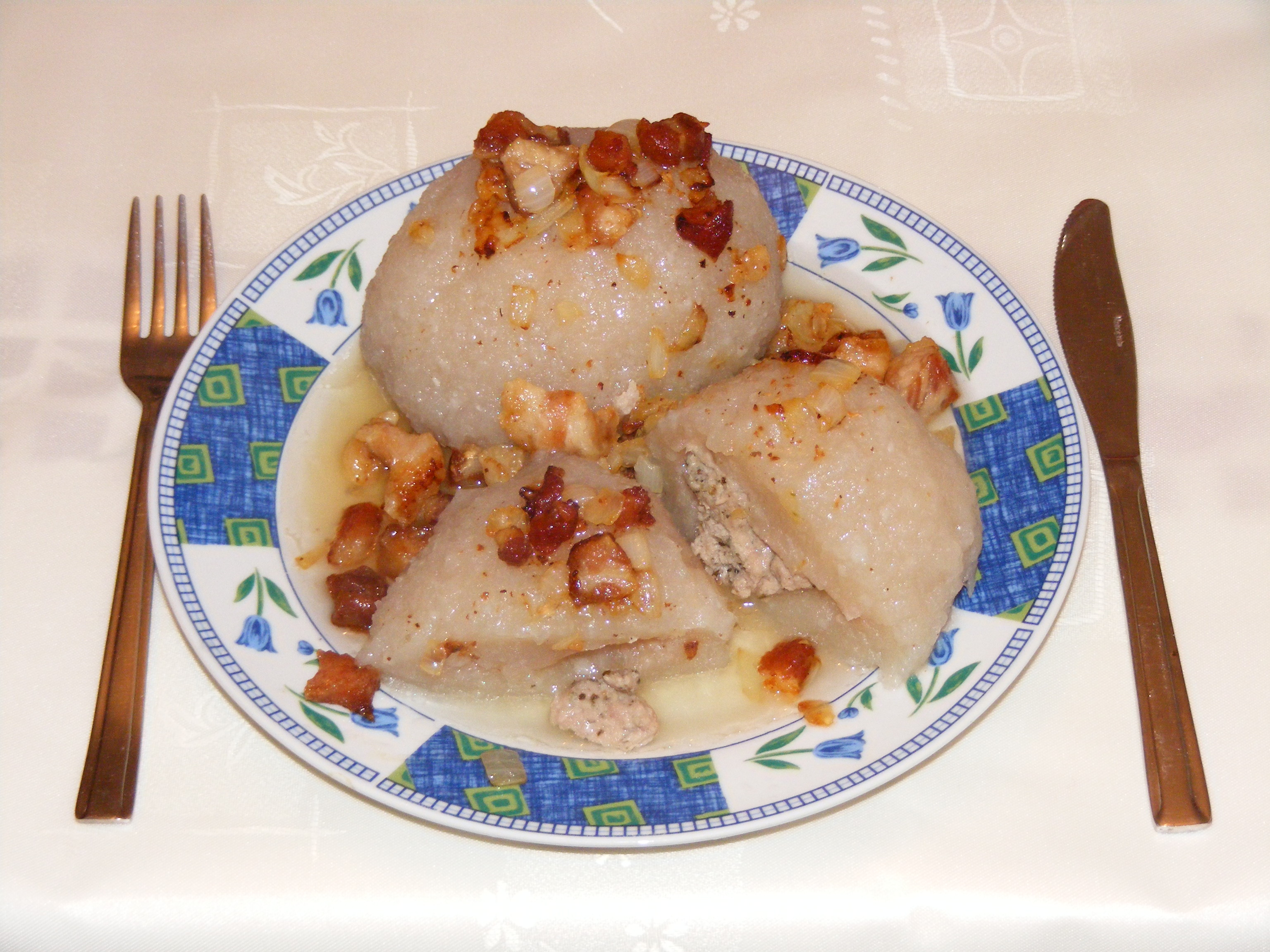
Kartacze

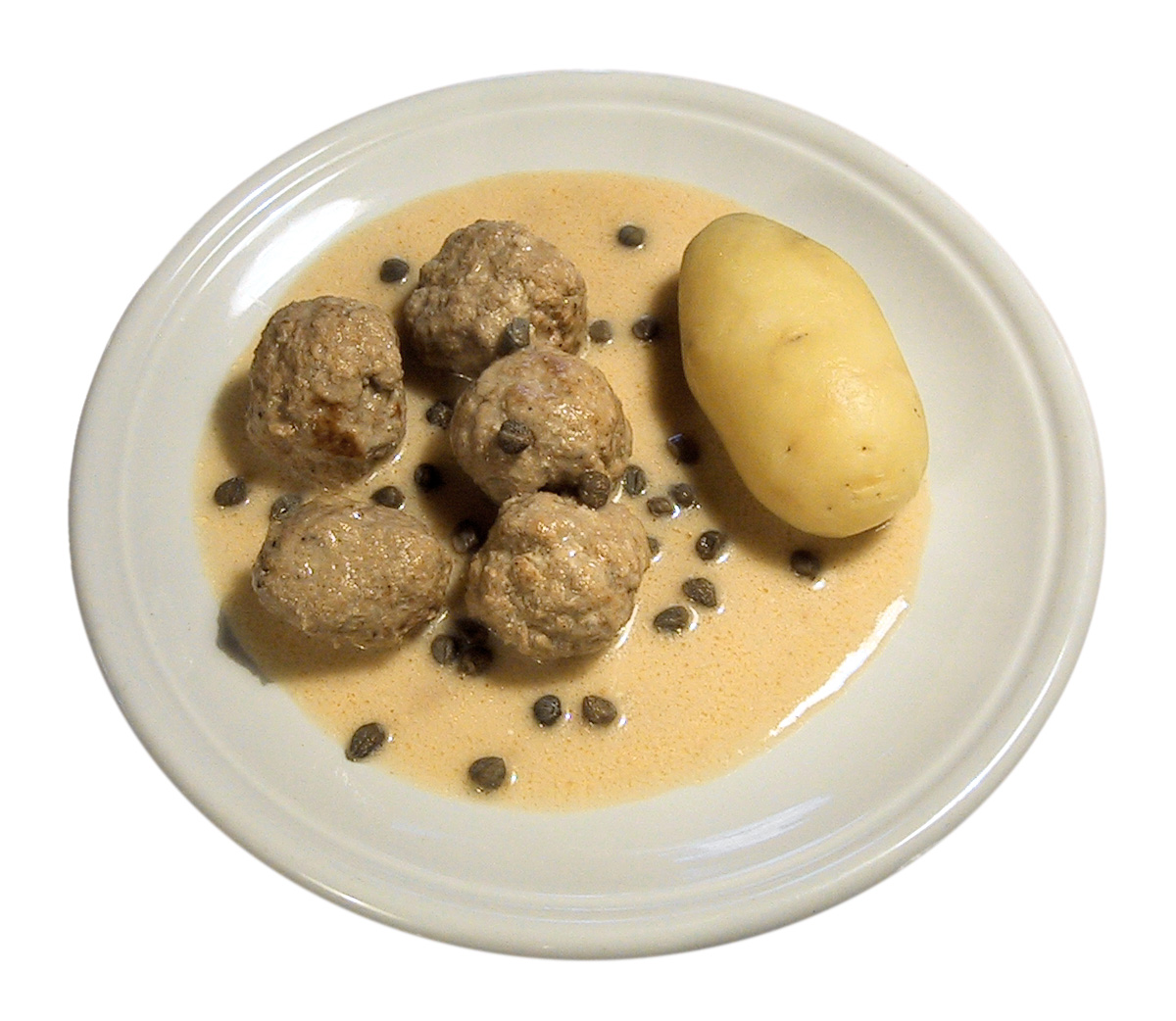
Klopsy królewieckie

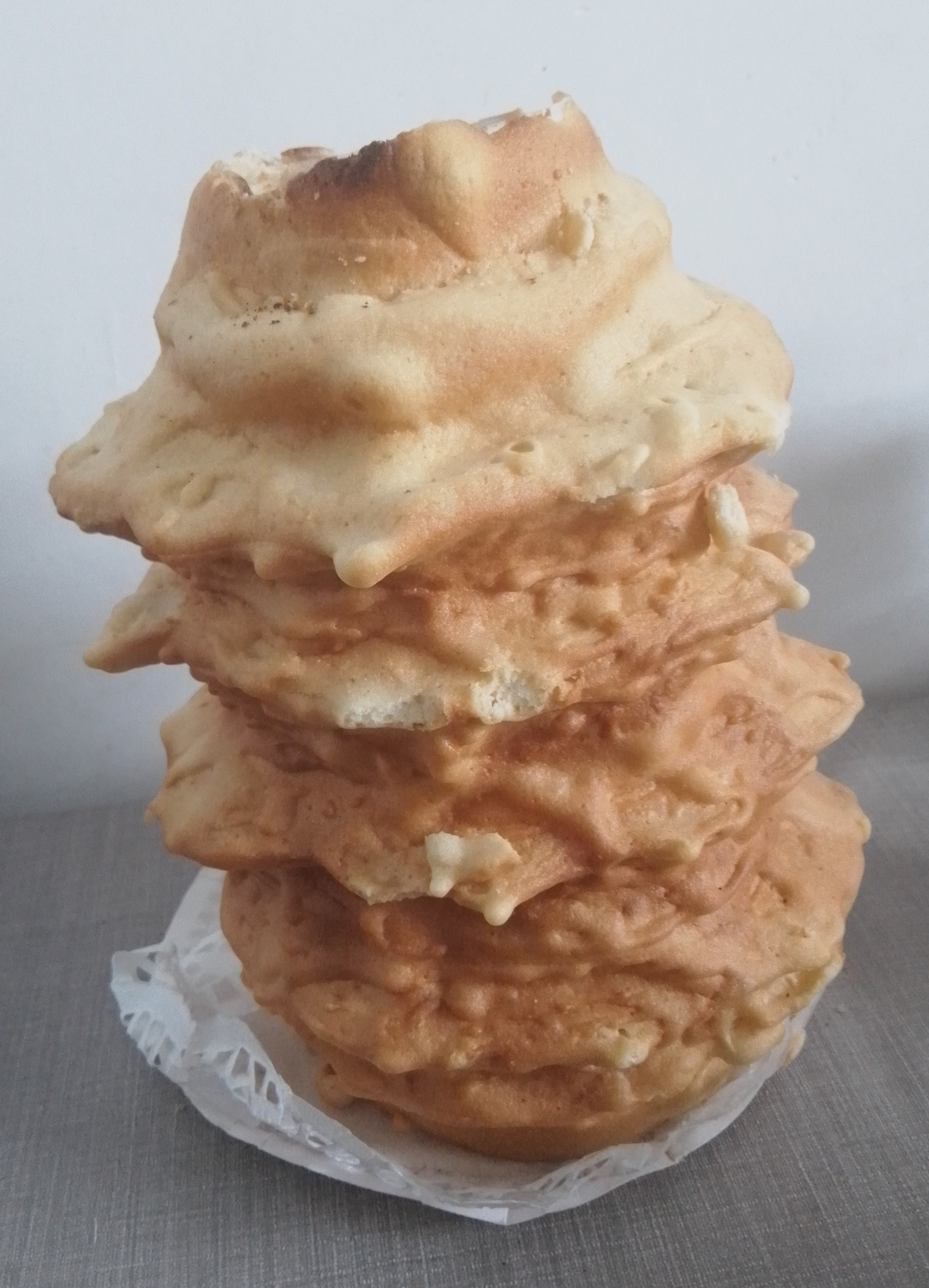
Sękacz cake

== Soups ==
All soups have fresh stock—made from chicken, beef, pork ribs, vegetables, or a combination of several root vegetables. Meat is either chopped and eaten with soup, used to make the next dish, or eaten with bread. It is common to eat two dishes during dinner: (1) a soup, and (2) a side dish (potato, rice, groats, pasta) with meat, stews, or sweet dishes. Although cream or purée soups are not common or traditional in Poland, they are still prepared because of the influence of other countries' cuisine. Often soups are whitened by adding a splash of sour or double cream.

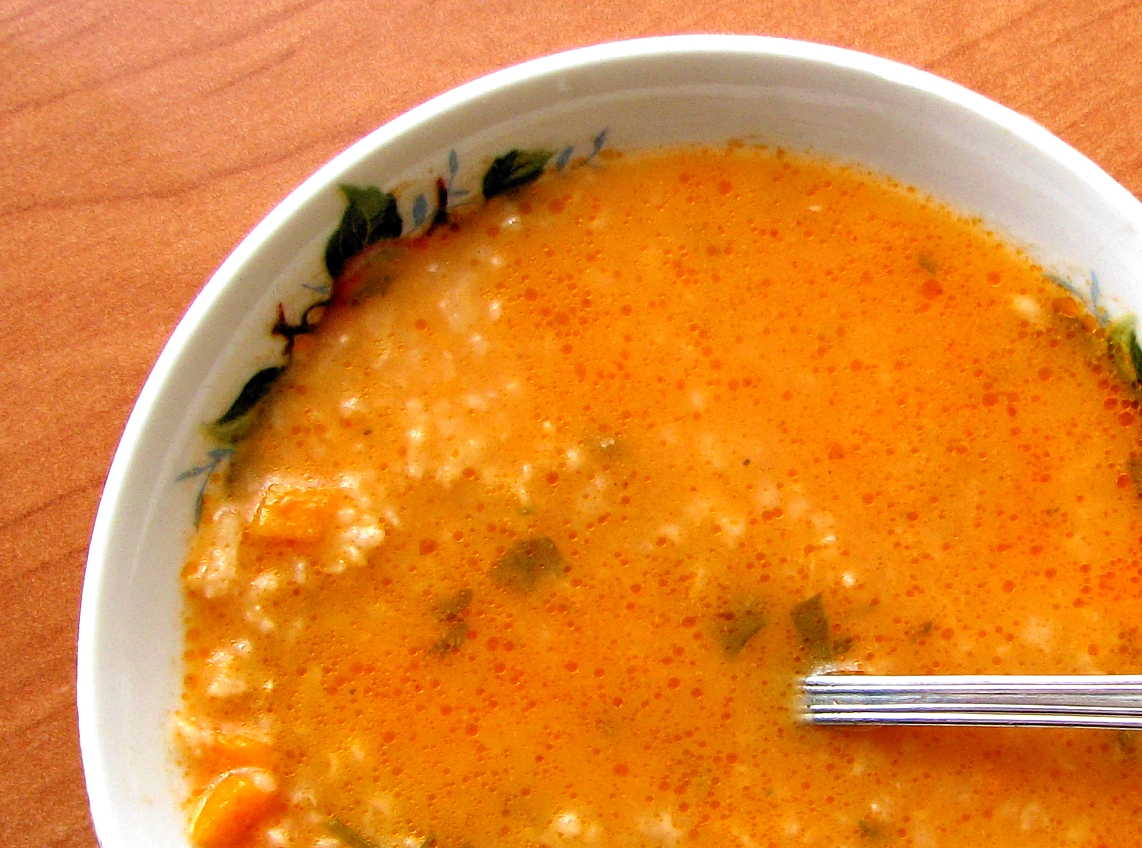
Zupa pomidorowa (tomato soup) with rice or pasta is a popular dish as part of a Polish dinner.

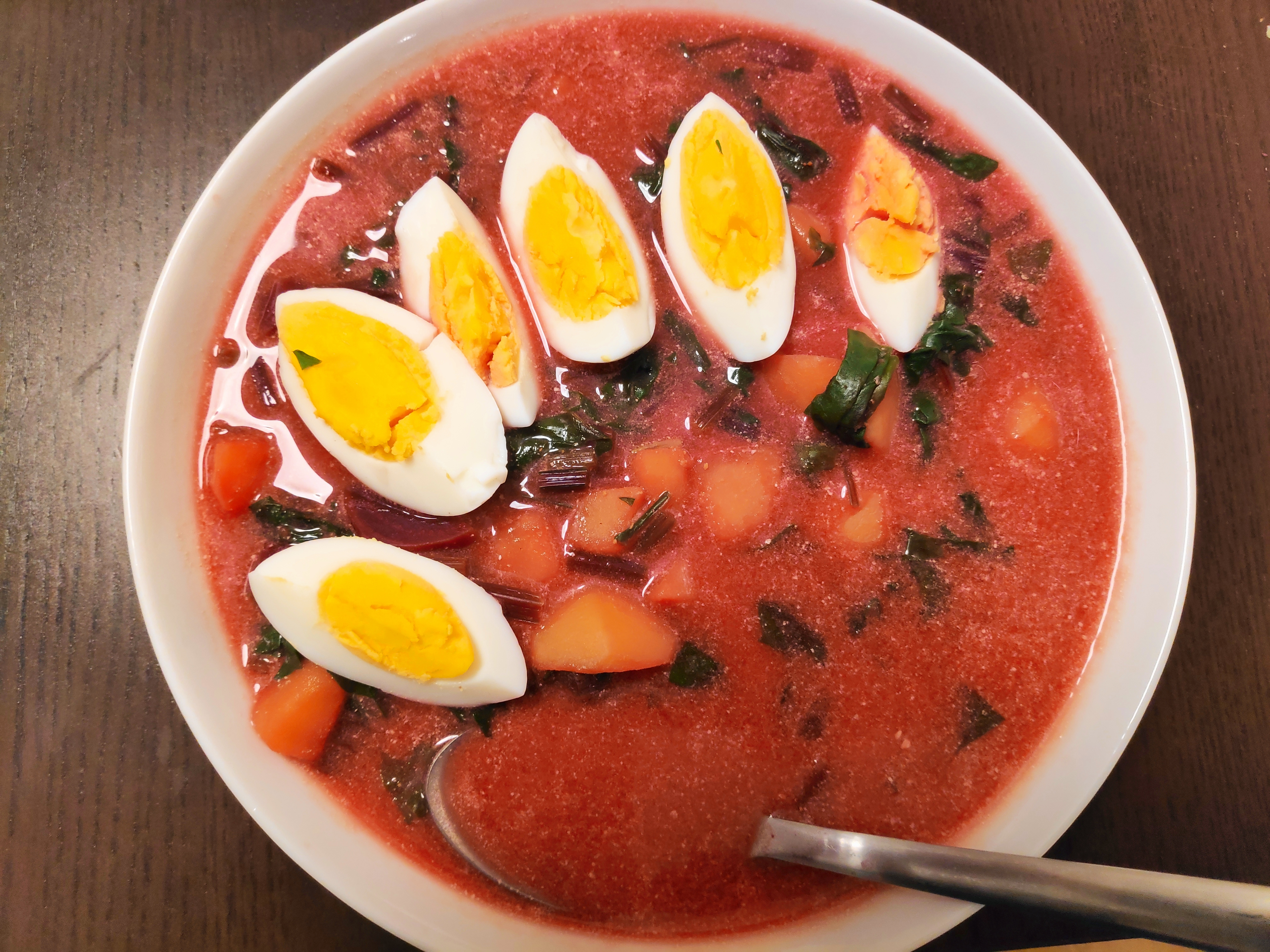
Botwinka young beetroot leaf soup with hard-boiled egg, popular in late spring season.

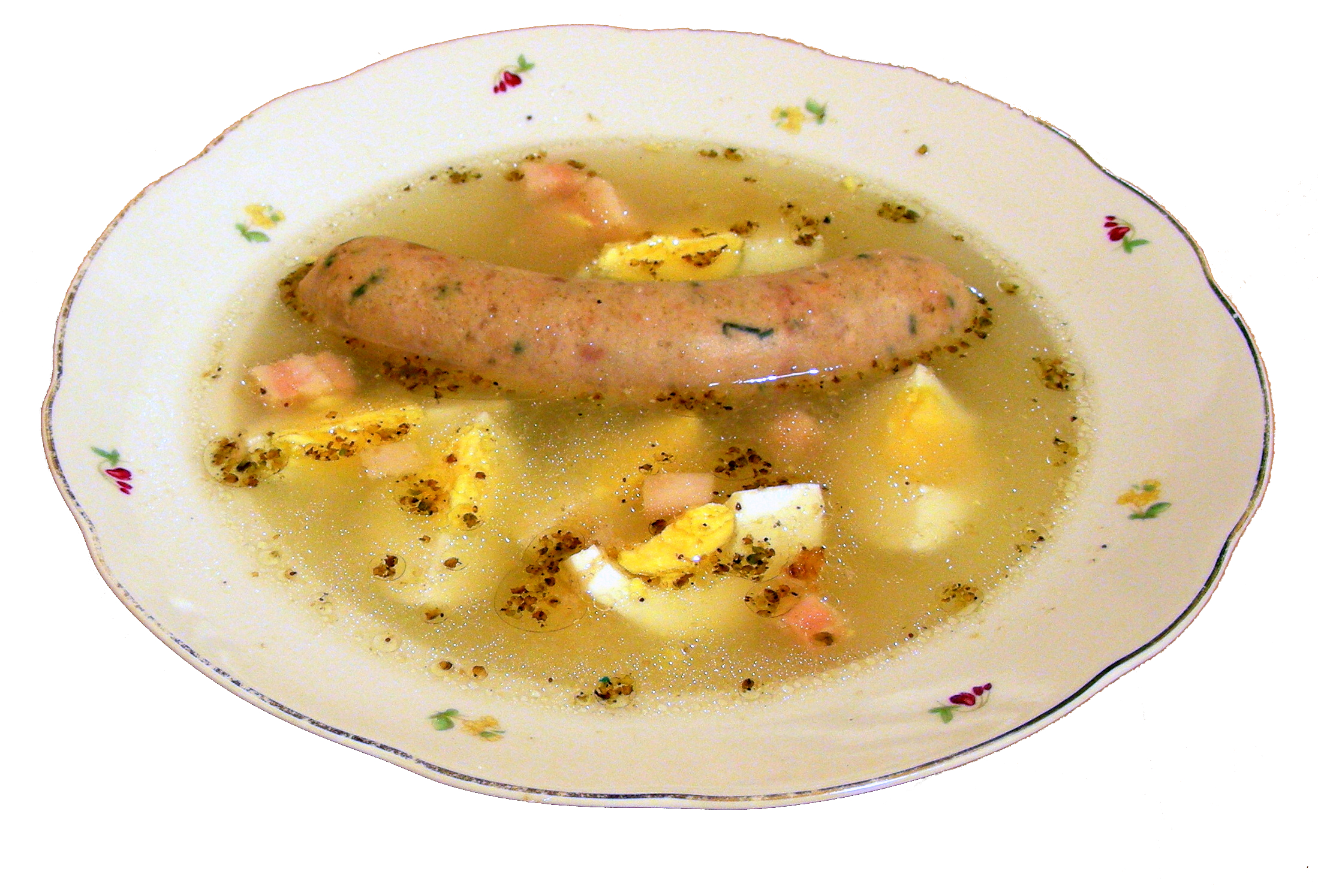
Żurek, a sour rye soup with biała kiełbasa and egg

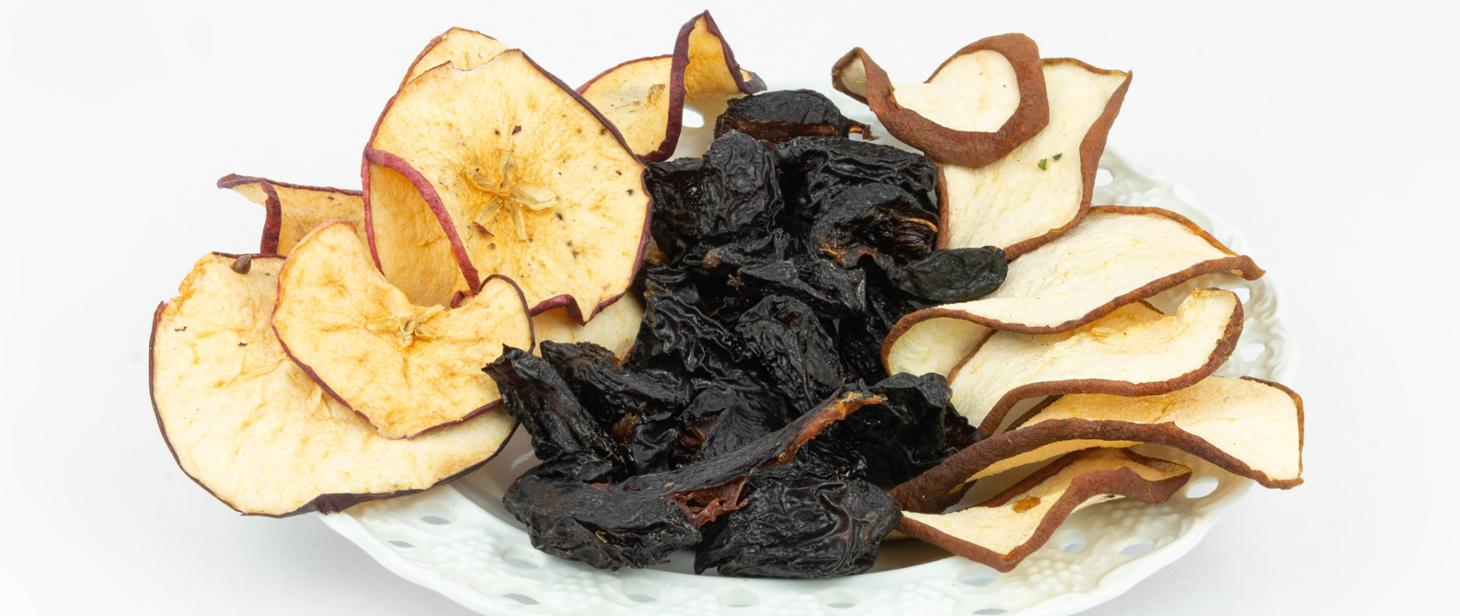
Dried apples, pears and plums – a traditional product of Poland, used, for example, to prepare Christmas compote.

- Zupa pomidorowa – Thin tomato soup made with tomato purée, root vegetables, and stock, usually served with pasta or rice; sour cream is often added.
- Kartoflanka – Potato soup with root vegetables.
- Czernina (or czarnina) – Duck soup made with duck broth or duck blood, the latter giving the soup a dark, almost black, colour. Recipes vary widely, but often sweet and sour ingredients are added, typically vinegar and often sugar, fruit juice, or fruit such as prunes or pears. It is usually served with the duck meat and Kluski-style noodles. Nowadays, it is not commonly eaten.
- Chłodnik litewski – Cold soup made of soured milk or sour cream, young beet leaves, cucumbers, and chopped fresh dill. Sometimes chives and radishes are added.
- Botwinka – Beet leaves soup with potatoes and root vegetables, served hot.
- Barszcz czerwony (red borscht) – Clear beetroot soup made out of stock, beetroots, and beetroot sourdough; served with uszka, krokiet (croquet) made from naleśniki (pancakes), pasztecik (paté), pierogi, and rarely with white beans, red kidney beans, or mashed potatoes. It is a very important dish during Christmas Eve.
- Zupa buraczkowa – Beetroot soup with grated beetroots, cubed potatoes, and root vegetables. Sometimes it is called "red borscht", like the one cooked during Christmas Eve, even though it does not contain beetroot sourdough. It is slightly sweet but not sour.
- Barszcz ukraiński (Ukrainian borscht) – Beetroot soup with addition of sliced white cabbage, white or red kidney beans, and diced or puréed tomatoes. In Ukraine, beans are not used in this dish.
- Zupa szczawiowa – Sorrel soup made of sorrel leaves and rice, served with hard-boiled egg.
- Flaki (or flaczki) – Beef or pork tripe stew with marjoram and spices. There is a vegetarian variety using oyster mushrooms instead.
- Rosół – Clear chicken soup served with noodles, usually short vermicelli. The stock is made of root vegetables and whole chicken, beef, or both.
- Zupa grzybowa / pieczarkowa – Mushroom soup made of white or wild mushrooms with potatoes or pasta. During Christmas Eve it is instead served with łazanki pasta or uszka.
- Zupa ogórkowa – A sour cucumber soup made of sour, salted cucumbers.
- Żur – Fermented cereal soup made of wholemeal rye sourdough, although oat sourdough is used in Lesser Poland and Podlachia, and buckwheat sourdough is used in Lublin Voivodeship. Like żurek and zalewajka, it is served with mashed potatoes, hard-boiled eggs, cooked and smoked bacon, and biała kiełbasa (white kielbasa).
- Żurek – Fermented cereal soup, more delicate than żur because it is made of wheat flour sourdough. Colloquially (but improperly) it is often called barszcz biały (white bortscht).
- Zalewajka (rye soup) – Fermented cereal soup made with sour rye. Served with sliced smoked pork sausage, cooked and smoked bacon, and separately cooked and diced potatoes.
- Barszcz biały – Fermented cereal soup made with wheat flour. Traditionally, cabbage sourdough (sauerkraut juice) or cucumber sourdough (sour pickled cucumbers juice) is used. Still, they can be replaced by using citric acid.
- Grochówka – Pea soup with split peas, potato, carrot, parsley root, kielbasa or fried bacon, and marjoram.
- Kapuśniak – Sauerkraut soup with potatoes, root vegetables (parsley root, carrots, celery root), bacon, and pork ribs.
- Kwaśnica – Sauerkraut soup with potatoes and ribs. Similar to kapuśniak, but omits other vegetables and tastes sourer.
- Forszmak lubelski – Pork or beef, smoked bacon, white mushrooms, sour pickled cucumbers, red bell pepper, tomato puree, spices, onion, and garlic.
- Chłodnik – Cold soup made of raw, partially blended, or cooked and chilled vegetables with yoghurt or sour cream (such as cucumber chłodnik or tomato chłodnik). Often served with cooked potatoes, hard-boiled eggs, or both.
- Zupa fasolowa (bean soup) – Made with white beans, root vegetables, smoked sausage (kielbasa), fried bacon, and marjoram.
- Zupa kapuściana (cabbage soup) – Made with stock, chopped white cabbage, root vegetables, tomato puree and potatoes.
- Zupa jarzynowa (vegetable soup) – Made with potatoes, green beans, root vegetables, cauliflower, peas, and sometimes brussels sprouts.
- Zupa ryżowa (rice soup) – Made with rice, potatoes, and root vegetables with chicken.
- Zupa koperkowa (dill soup) – Made with chicken stock, root vegetables, a big amount of dill, spring onion, potatoes or baby potatoes, and sometimes with sour or double cream.
- Zupa chrzanowa (horseradish soup) – Made with white kielbasa, smoked bacon or pork ribs, sour cream, horseradish, garlic, potatoes, and root vegetables for stock; can be served with hard-boiled eggs.
- Zupa gołąbkowa – Soup with minced meat, cabbage, tomato puree, tomatoes, rice, and spices.
- Zupa kalafiorowa (cauliflower soup) – Made with stock, potatoes, cauliflower florets, and root vegetables.
- Zupa brokułowa (broccoli soup) – Made with stock, potatoes, broccoli florets, and root vegetables.
- Zupa gulaszowa (goulash soup) – Made with pork, beef, potatoes, onion or leek, passata, tomato puree, paprika, and red bell pepper. It is similar to Hungarian goulash, whilst Polish goulash is similar to pörkölt.
- Zupa soczewicowa (or soczewicy) (lentil soup) – Made with green or red lentils, garlic, tomatoes, tomato puree, onion, and double or sour cream. May be served with pasta or potatoes.
- Zupa owocowa (fruit soup) – Served cold with different fruits and pasta during hot summer.

== Meat and fish ==
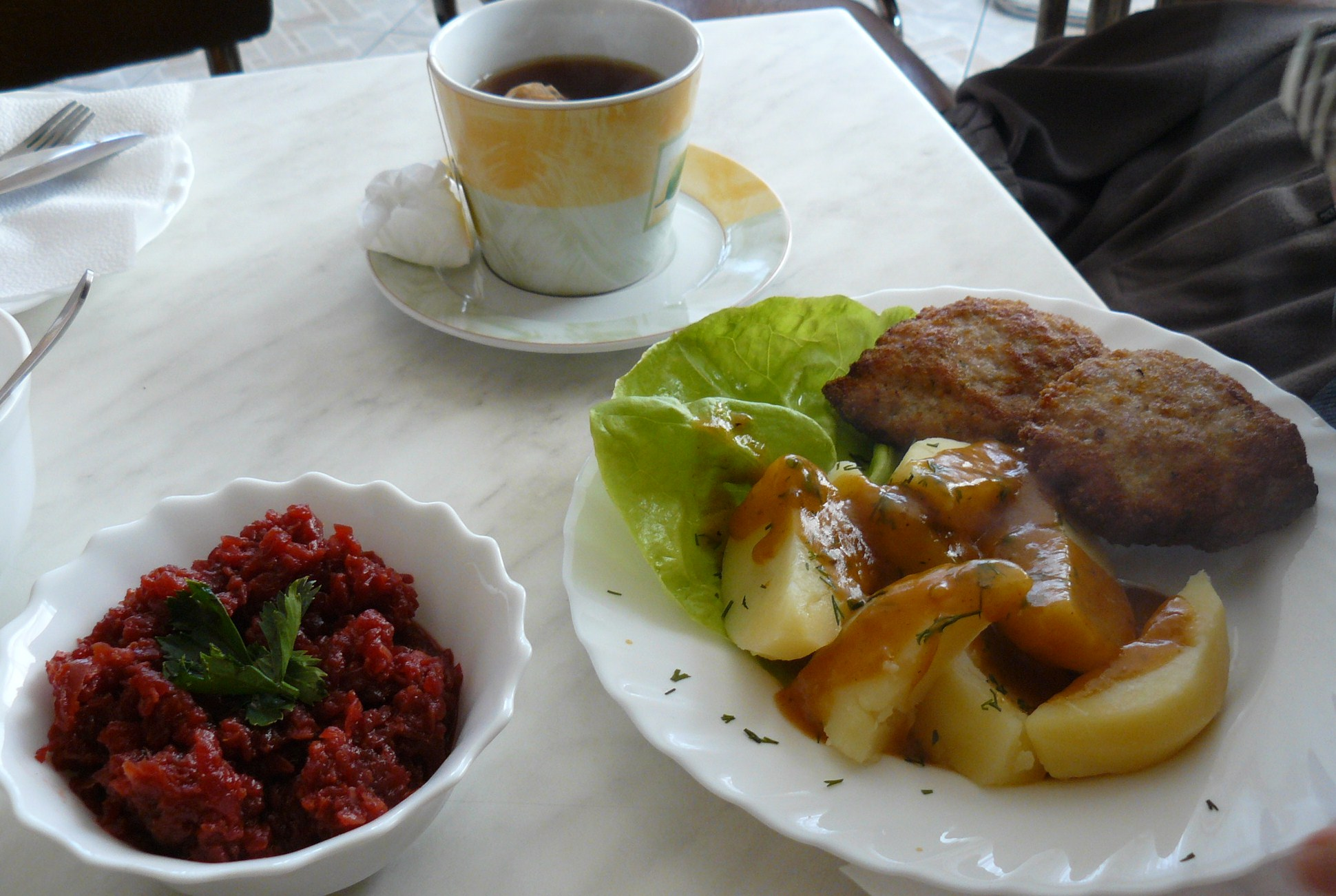
A typical Polish meal: kotlety mielone (minced pork cutlet), potatoes, beets and tea with lemon

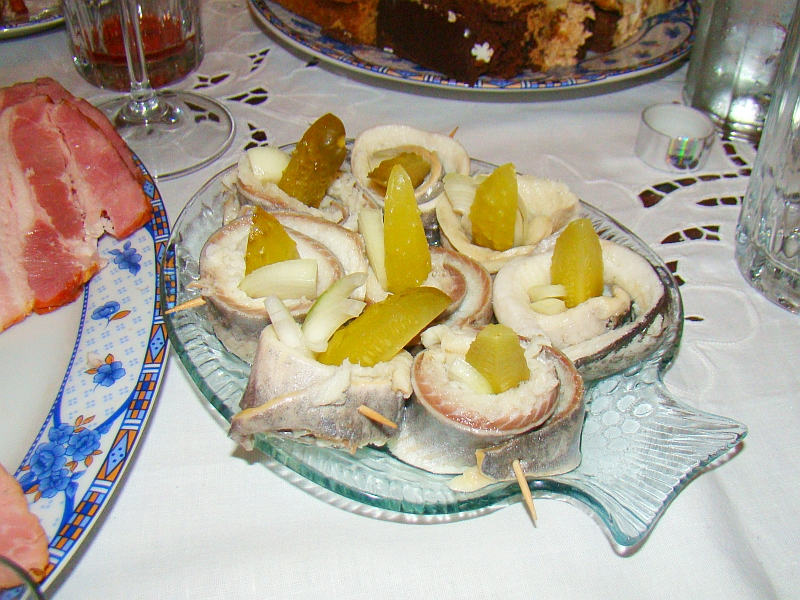
Rolmopsy (rollmops), rolled pickled herring fillets, served during Christmas. Traditional to Polish, German and Jewish cuisines.

- Baranina – Roasted, stewed, or grilled mutton.
- Bigos – Stew of mainly sauerkraut, cabbage, and meats such as smoked kielbasa and bacon. Also contains mushrooms, onions, and sometimes tomato puree. It is known as a "hunter's stew" due to the addition of game and scraps of other meats.
- Bitki wołowe z pieczarkami / grzybami – Thin slices of beef braised with mushrooms.
- Bitki wieprzowe w sosie własnym – Thin slices of pork in gravy, braised with onions.
- Golonka – Stewed pork knuckle or hock.
- Gołąbki – Cabbage rolls with ground meat and rice or groats, served with mushroom, dill, or tomato sauce. For Christmas Eve, meat may be substituted with mushrooms. A variety with mushroom and potato filling is mostly found in Eastern Poland due to influence from Ukraine. Cabbage leaves used are from savoy cabbage or white cabbage. Rarely, it can be made with red cabbage or sauerkraut leaves. Modern versions include use of chinese cabbage or filling wrapped in zucchini slices. This dish is either cooked or baked.
- Gołąbki bez zawijania (gołąbki without wrapping) – Large meatballs filled with chopped cabbage, onion and rice.
- Gulasz – Meat stew originated from Hungarian pörkölt with onions, tomatoes, red bell peppers, and paprika.
- Karkówka – Pork neck, roasted, grilled, or braised with onions.
- Kiełbasa – Sausage, smoked or boiled, usually made with pork. It is a staple of Polish cuisine and comes in dozens of varieties.
- Kotlet mielony – Minced meat (pork, pork-beef, or turkey) patty made with egg, breadcrumbs, chopped onions, wet bread, and spices, often rolled in breadcrumbs. Sometimes filled with cheese, mushrooms, or both.
- Kotlet schabowy – Thinly pounded pork loin cutlet coated in breadcrumbs. It is a variation of schnitzel.
- Kurczak Pieczony – Roasted chicken.
- Pieczeń cielęca – Roasted veal.
- Pieczeń wieprzowa z winem – Roasted pork in wine gravy.
- Polędwiczki wołowe – Braised beef sirloin slices.
- Pulpety or Klopsiki w sosie – Polish style meatballs in tomato, mushroom, or dill sauce.
- Rolada z mięsa mielonego z pieczarkami – Minced meat roulade with mushrooms.
- Schab Faszerowany – Stuffed pork loin.
- Wołowina Pieczona – Roasted beef.
- Zrazy zawijane – Thin beef fillets rolled and filled with bacon, mushrooms, mustard, gherkins, and onions.
- Roladki schabowe/z kurczaka – Thin pork/chicken fillets rolled with filling including version with cheese.
- Żeberka wędzone – Smoked spare ribs.
- Filet z dorsza – Cod fillet with or without batter. Can be steam cooked or baked.
- Łosoś – Steamed or baked salmon fillet.
- Pstrąg – Poached or baked trout.
- Rolmopsy – Rolled pickled herring fillets stuffed with pickled onion or cucumbers.
- Ryba Smażona – Fried breaded fish fillet.
- Śledzie – Herring marinated in oil or vinegar with onions.
- Śledzie w śmietanie – Herring marinated in sour cream with onions. Sour pickled cucumbers, apples, and mushrooms can also be added.
- Zimne nogi – Polish savoury jelly based on bone broth made from pork legs and served with chopped meat and vegetables, like peas or carrots. Served with a drizzle of vinegar or lemon juice. Dish originates from Jewish cuisine. If using meat other than pork leg, it is called galareta.

== Flour or potato-based ==
- Pierogi – Half-moon-shaped dumplings with various fillings. Savoury pierogi may be filled with sauerkraut and mushrooms, potato, quark and fried onion (pierogi ruskie, Ruthenian pierogi), minced meat, or buckwheat groats and quark or mushrooms. Sweet pierogi can be made with sweet quark or with fruits such as blueberries, strawberries, cherries, plums, raspberries, apples, or even chocolate.
- Uszka – Tiny dumplings traditionally filled only with mushrooms and onions. Other fillings used are mushrooms with sauerkraut or rarely cooked and minced meat with onions. When filled with meat, they are served with clear borscht, clear mushroom soup, or broth.
- Kołduny – Stuffed dumplings with raw minced beef and mutton, beef dripping, fried onions, and spices. Potato kalduny is a different dish from Subcarpathia made from potato dough filled with twaróg (quark), potatoes, and onions.
- Placki ziemniaczane / kartoflane – Potato pancakes with grated potatoes, onions, eggs, wheat flour, and marjoram.
- Pyzy – Potato dumplings made with raw, grated potatoes, egg, flour, and sometimes filled with minced meat; then cooked.
- Knedle – Potato dumplings made with cooked potatoes and starch. Usually filled with fruits, most popular being plums and strawberries.
- Kopytka – Hoof-shaped potato dumplings made of cooked potatoes, egg, and flour. Often served with breadcrumbs, sugar, and melted butter or fried bacon.
- Pierogi / kluski leniwe – Hoof-shaped dumplings made of flour or potatoes, eggs, and quark.
- Kluski śląskie – Dumplings in small donut-like shape made with boiled potatoes and potato starch. Often served with gravy or meat stew.
- Czarne / szare kluski – Dumplings black or gray in colour, made of raw grated potatoes and potato starch.
- Pampuchy / kluski na parze / pyzy drozdżowe – Steamed yeast wheat flour dumplings served with fruit yoghurt or jam. They can be also served savoury with gravy or filled with chocolate.
- Kluski kładzione (laid dumplings) – Dumplings made of thick batter with flour and eggs laid in boiling water.
- Lane Kluski (poured dumplings) – Dumplings made of thin batter with flour, milk, and eggs, usually poured straight into soup.
- Zacierki (grated dumplings) – Grated or chopped dough into tiny balls and cooked.
- Naleśniki – Thicker and plumper version of crêpes, served with sweet or savoury filling.
- Krokiety (croquettes) – In Poland, they are made of naleśniki, often filled with either sauerkraut and mushrooms or ham and cheese, then folded like a burrito, breaded, and fried. Commonly served with clear borscht.
- Racuchy – Yeast pancakes often stuffed with apples and served with powdered sugar or jam.
- Łazanki – Pasta shaped like small squares. This Polish version is served with sauerkraut, onion, and fried kielbasa or fried bacon.
- Zapiekanka – Open faced sandwich made from a veka roll sliced in half and topped with tomato sauce, mushrooms, and cheese. Zapiekanka can also be anything baked in casserole dish with added egg and cream mixture, so it holds together when removed. It usually involves meats, vegetables with potatoes or pasta, and melted cheese on top. A baked Polish fast food.
- Knysza – Polish fast food with yeast bread roll filled with red and white cabbage, tomato, cucumber, pickled cucumber, onion, fried onion, corn, and sometimes fried chicken with garlic mayonnaise sauce. It originated in Wrocław.
- Smażone ziemniaki / bratkartofle – Fried slices of potatoes (often previously cooked) usually (1) eaten with a fried egg, (2) mixed in scrambled eggs, onions, and grilled, or (3) mixed with fried, sliced kielbasa. Whole dish and serving with eggs (German: bratkartoffeln mit ei) or sausage (bratkartoffeln mit wurst) comes from Germany. In Poland, it is often eaten with a glass of sour buttermilk or kefir.
- Makaron z jajkiem – Fried (cooked) pasta with fried onions, scrambled eggs, and butter; sometimes cheese, bacon, or ham can be added. It is a version of Italian spaghetti carbonara (Italian: spaghetti con uova e cipolla).

== Side dishes and salads ==
- Kasza – Cooked groats; most popular are groats of buckwheat, barley, millet, and wheat.
- Mizeria – Traditional Polish salad made with sliced cucumbers, sour cream, and spices; served as a side.
- Surówka z jabłka i marchewki – Carrot salad made with peeled and grated carrots, apples, oil, and lemon juice.
- Surówka z ogórków i pomidorów – Salad made with cucumbers, tomatoes, onions, and oil or sour cream.
- Ziemniaki gotowane – Simple boiled potatoes sprinkled with dill.
- Tłuczone ziemniaki – Mashed potatoes.
- Surówka z białej kapusty – Salad with shredded cabbage, carrots, and spices, often with grated apples.
- Surówka z kiszonej kapusty – Salad with sauerkraut, carrots, parsley, apples, and lemon juice.
- Sałatka warzywna or Jarzynowa – Salad of cooked vegetables such as parsley root, carrot, potatoes, celery root, pickled cucumbers in brine, and hard-cooked eggs in mayonnaise and mustard. Also often contains corn, peas, apple, onion, leek, or even red kidney beans. A traditional Polish side dish.
- Kapusta zasmażana – Sauerkraut or white cabbage pan-fried with onions and spices, often with fried bacon.
- Kapusta na gęsto – Braised white cabbage with onions, dill, and double cream.
- Surówka – Any salad made of raw vegetables with drizzle of vinegar, oil, sour cream, or yoghurt.
- Sałatka – Any salad made of cooked vegetables, usually with mayonnaise.
- Sałatka burakowa / buraczki tarte – Cooked and grated beetroot salad; can be made warm or cold.
- Ćwikła – Cooked and grated beetroots with horseradish paste and lemon juice.
- Fasolka szparagowa z czosnkiem – Green beans with garlic and butter or oil; originated in Italy.
- Kalafior / fasolka szparagowa / brukselka z bułką tartą – Cooked cauliflower, green beans, or Brussels sprouts with a polonaise sauce made of fried breadcrumbs in butter.
- Brokuł / kalafior z sosem czosnkowym – Cooked broccoli or cauliflower with a garlic sauce.
- Ogórek kiszony – Polish pickled cucumber, fermented in brine consisting of dill and dill flower, garlic, salt, and spices.
- Ogórek konserwowy – Pickled cucumber in vinegar, which is rather sweet and vinegary in taste.
- Grzyby marynowane – Marinated mushrooms.
- Sałatka szwedzka – Preserved salad made with cucumbers, onions, carrots, vinegar, and spices.
- Sałatka ziemniaczana – Potato salad made with cooked potatoes, onions, pickled cucumbers, dill, and mayonnaise; sometimes with added smoked bacon or herring fillets marinated in oil or vinegar. Originally from Germany.
- Sałatka śledziowa – Marinated herring salad with pickled cucumbers, onions, and sour cream; sometimes eggs and apples are added.

== Bread ==
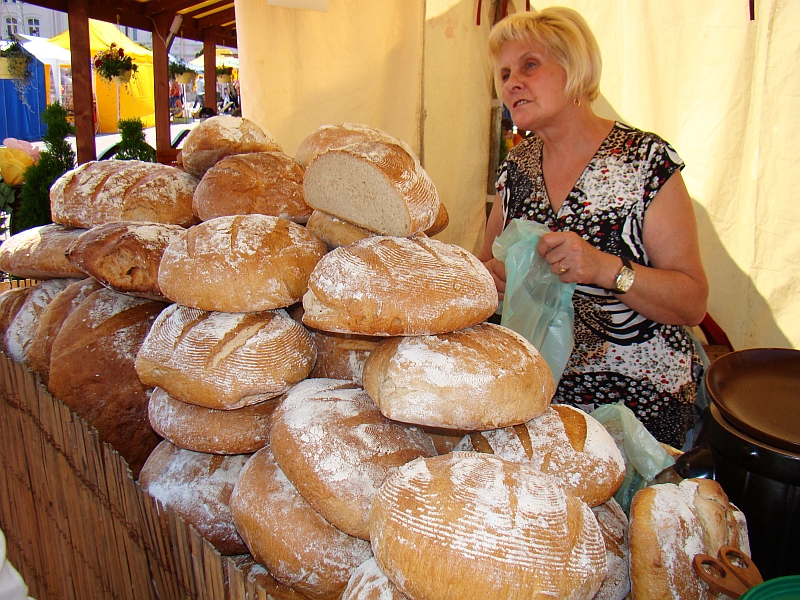
Bread stand in Sanok, Poland

Bread (chleb) and bread rolls (bułka (bread roll), bajgiel, rogal, bułka paryska) have been an essential part of Polish cuisine and tradition for centuries. Today, bread remains one of the most important foods in the Polish cuisine. The main ingredient for Polish bread is rye or wheat. Traditional bread has a crunchy crust, a soft interior, and an unforgettable aroma. Such bread is made with sourdough, which lends it a distinctive taste. It can be stored for a week or so without getting too hard and is not crumbly when cut.

In Poland, welcoming with bread and salt ("chlebem i solą") is often associated with the traditional hospitality ("staropolska gościnność") of the Polish nobility (szlachta), who prided themselves on their hospitality. A 17th-century Polish poet, Wespazjan Kochowski, wrote in 1674: "O good bread, when it is given to guests with salt and good will!" Another poet, Wacław Potocki, mentioned this custom. The custom was, however, not limited to the nobility, as Polish people of all classes observed this tradition, reflected in old Polish proverbs. Nowadays, the tradition is mainly observed on wedding days, when newlyweds are greeted with bread and salt by their parents on returning from the church wedding.

== Desserts and sweets ==
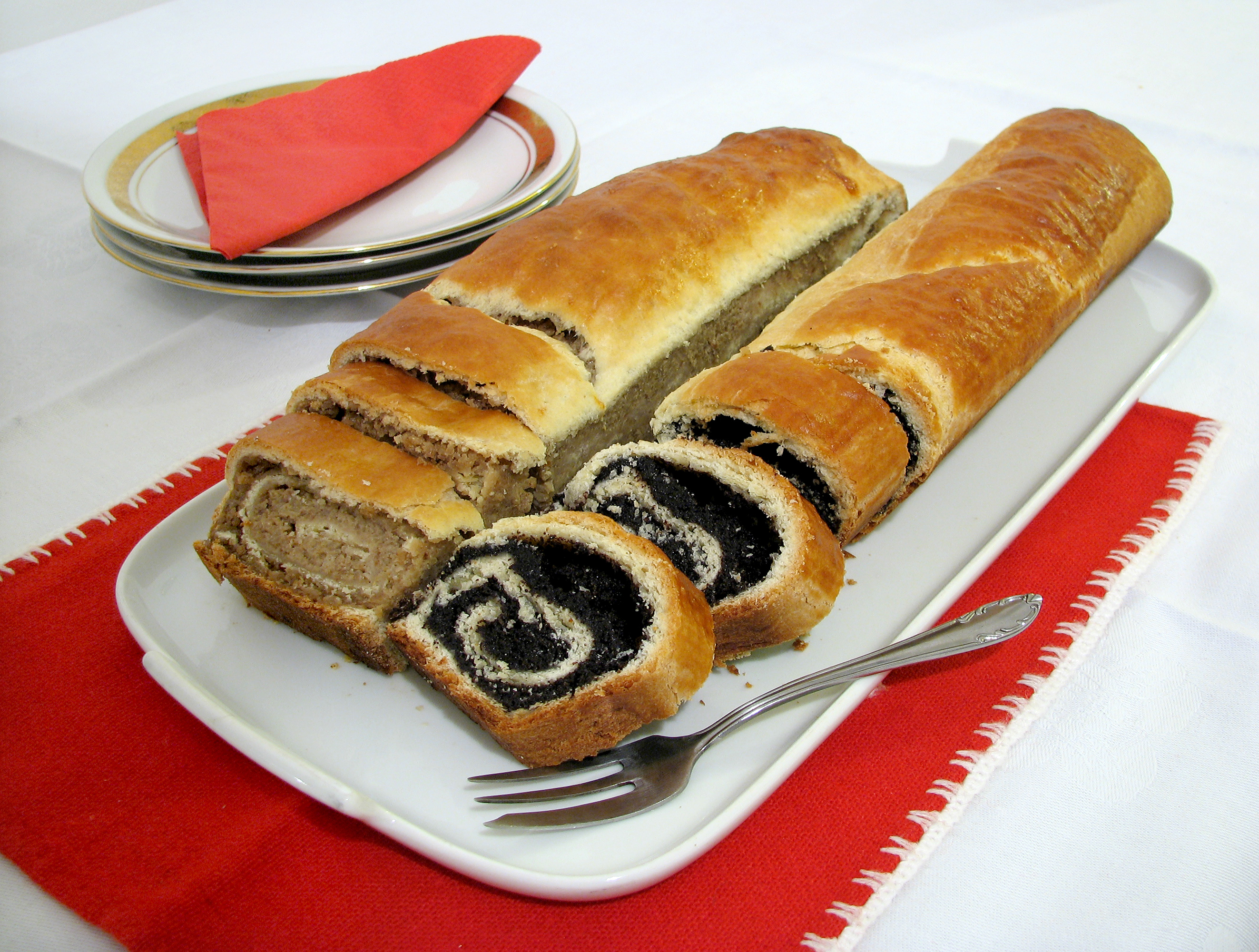
Makowiec (poppy seed roll)

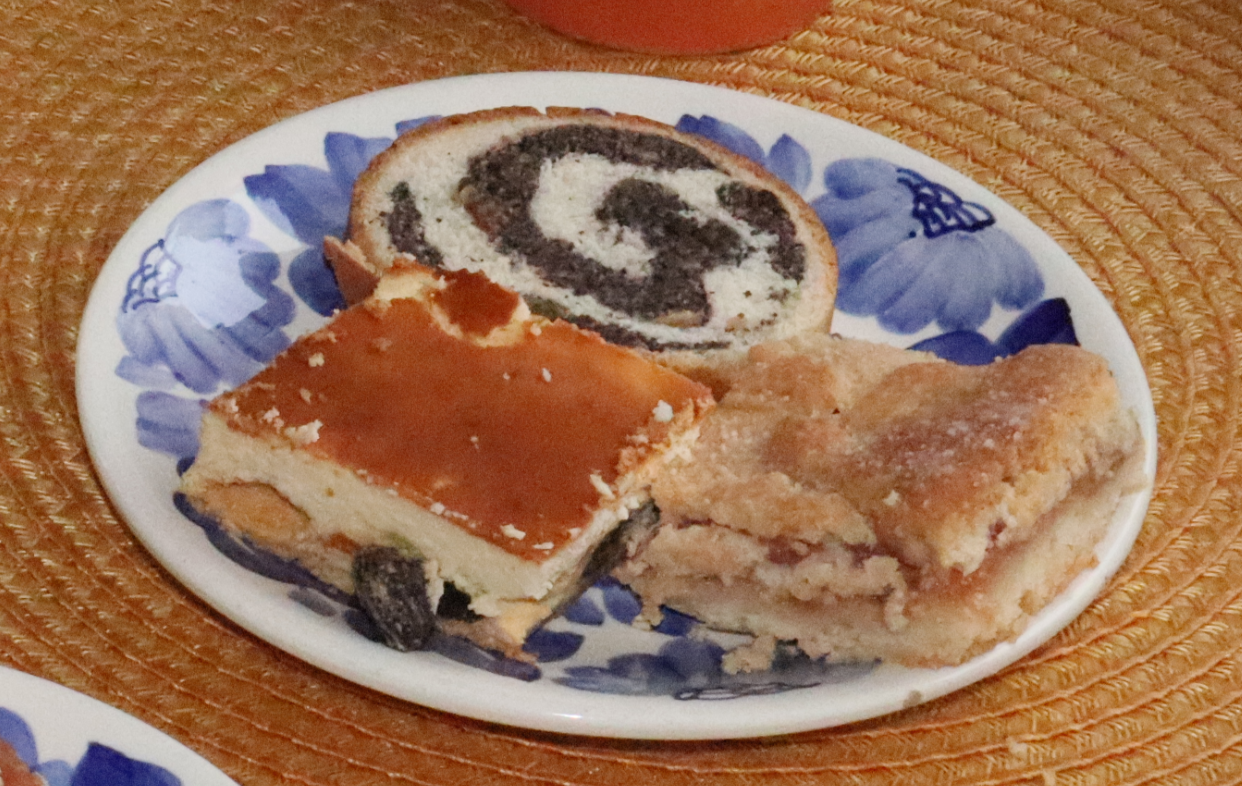
Makowiec, szarlotka (apple pie) and sernik (cheesecake) with raisins

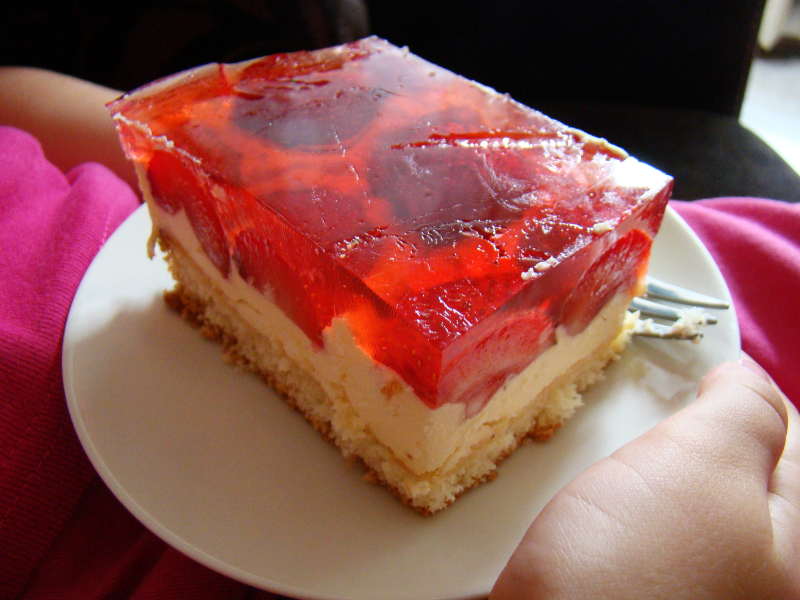
Sernik (cheesecake)

- Beza – Type of sweet meringue in biscuit form, occasionally with topping.
- Makowiec – Sweet poppy-seed swiss roll, with raisins, dried fruits, and walnuts.
- Pączek – Closed donuts filled with rose petal jam, other fruit conserves, custard, chocolate, or quark with sugar.
- Pierniki – Soft gingerbread biscuit forms of pryanik, unfilled or filled with marmalade of different fruit flavours, and sometimes covered with chocolate.
- Sernik (cheesecake) – One of the most popular desserts in Poland. It is a cake made primarily of twaróg, a type of fresh cheese similar to quark. It can be baked or refrigerated. It might be flavoured with vanilla, lemon peel, or orange peel. Sometimes raisins or various fresh fruits are added. Commonly topped with a chocolate topping or sprinkled with coconut-flakes or nuts. It is very popular to garnish it with a sweet jelly topping with a variety of fresh fruits when it is unbaked.
- Mazurek – Pie baked particularly at Christmas Eve and Easter, made with shortcrust pastry. There are variations with different fillings, such as walnut paste, dulce de leche or ganache with dried fruits, candied fruit, and nuts.
- Chałka – Sweet white wheat bread of Jewish origin (challah).
- Kogel mogel (eggnog) – Made from egg yolks, sugar, and flavourings such as honey, vanilla, or cocoa. Traditional for Polish Jews.
- Krówki – Polish fudge; soft milk toffee candies.
- Napoleonka – Polish type of cream pie made of two layers of puff pastry, filled with vanilla pastry cream, usually sprinkled with powdered sugar. A close relative of the French millefeuille. An alternative but less popular version is kremówka, often filled with whipped cream instead of custard cream.
- Keks – Cake with candied and dried fruit.
- Babka – Polish version of a pound cake, made with or without yeast. It is served with powdered sugar or icing. Can be made as a marble cake.
- Miodownik – Layered honey cake filled with vanilla pastry cream and ganache on top.
- Orzechowiec – Layered nut cake filled with vanilla pastry cream and kajmak, topped with chopped nuts.
- Ciasto marchewkowe – Carrot cake with added nuts and honey, sometimes layered with whipped cream.
- Ciasto bez pieczenia / na zimno – Various types of unbaked and refrigerated cakes made of biscuits, ladyfingers, crackers, or sponge cake with vanilla, whipped cream, coconut, jelly, mascarpone, semolina, or poppy seed filling. Often topped with ganache.
- Karpatka – Cream pie made of two layers of choux pastry filled with vanilla pastry cream.
- Wuzetka – Layered chocolate sponge cake filled with jam and whipped cream, associated with Warsaw.
- Ptasie mleczko – Chocolate-covered candy filled with soft meringue (or milk soufflé).
- Kisiel – Clear, jelly-like sweet fruit liquid, made with starch, sugar, and fruits or fruit juice.
- Budyń – Pudding that usually comes in many different flavours, such as sweet cream, vanilla, chocolate, cherry, and more.
- Faworki – Light fried pastry covered with powdered sugar.
- Pańska Skórka, Miodek – Hard taffy sold at cemeteries during Zaduszki and at Stare Miasto (Old Town) in Warsaw.
- Kutia – Grain dish made with wheat, poppy seeds, nuts, raisins, and honey. Not traditionally Polish, but served during Christmas in the eastern regions like Białystok and Podlachia.
- Prince Polo - Polish chocolate bar.
- Mieszanka Wedlowska – Assorted chocolate covered candy.
- Torcik Wedlowski – Large, circular, chocolate covered wafer with hand-made decorations.
- Pawełek – Chocolate bar with a flavoured filling, most popular contains advocaat.
- Śliwka w czekoladzie – Chocolate-covered prune.
- Ryż z jabłkami – Type of a rice pudding baked or cooked with apples and cinnamon.

== Beverages ==
=== Alcohol ===
Traditional Polish alcoholic beverages include mead, beer, vodka (Old Polish: okowita, gorzała), and to a lesser extent, wine. In recent decades, beer has become very common.

Wine is less frequently drunk, however, in recent years, the consumption of wine has risen along with increasing production of local grape wines in small vineyards in Lesser Poland, Subcarpathia, Silesia, and West Pomerania regions.

Among alcoholic beverages, Polish vodka—traditionally prepared from grain or potatoes—has essentially displaced the formerly widespread mead.

Some sources suggest that the first production of vodka took place in Poland as early as the 8th century, becoming more widespread in the 11th century. The world's first written mention of the drink and of the word "vodka" was in 1405 from Akta Grodzkie recorder of deeds, the court documents from the Palatinate of Sandomierz in Poland.

Vodka production on a much larger scale began in Poland at the end of the 16th century. Vodka was the most popular alcoholic drink in Poland until 1998, when it was surpassed by beer.

Beside clear vodkas, flavoured vodka (known as nalewka) and liqueurs are also popular. The most important are Żubrówka (vodka with bison grass from Podlaskie), herbal Żołądkowa Gorzka, aged starka, plum brandy śliwowica (especially from Łącko), honey liqueur krupnik, as well as Goldwasser (herbal liqueur with flakes of gold leaf) and juniper vodka machandel, both originating from Gdańsk.

=== Non-alcoholic drinks ===
Traditionally, kvass (kwas chlebowy) was a fermented beverage first popular among the peasantry, but it later spread to the szlachta and became a universal Polish drink by the 14th-15th centuries. It is typically made from rye bread, usually known as black bread, and is not classified as an alcoholic beverage in Poland, as its alcohol content usually ranges from 0% to 2%. There are many commercial and family variations of the beverage; however, traditional Polish recipes still exist. Despite its production on an industrial scale in Poland during the interbellum, it began to lose popularity to mass-produced soft drinks and carbonated water in the 20th century. It remained known primarily in rural areas of eastern Poland. However, kvass started making a comeback in the 21st century, with many new Polish brands being started.

Since the turn of the century, tea is perhaps the most popular beverage, usually served with a slice of lemon and sweetened with either sugar or honey. Tea came to Poland from England shortly after its appearance in Western Europe, mainly due to the Dutch merchants. However, its prevalence is attributed to the Russians in the 19th century – at this time samovars imported from Russia become commonplace in Polish homes. Tea with milk is called bawarka (lit. 'Bavarian style').

Coffee has been widely drunk since the 18th century, when Poland bordered the Ottoman Empire.

Other frequently consumed beverages include buttermilk, kefir, soured milk, instant coffee, various mineral waters, juices, and numerous brands of soft drinks. A considerable number of Poles enjoy carbonated water, and customers in restaurants are always offered both still and sparkling (carbonated) water to drink.

== Lists of common Polish dishes found on a national level ==
- List of common Polish soups
- Common main courses
- Common desserts
- Common beverages
- Common folk medicine

== See also ==
- List of Polish desserts
- List of Polish dishes
