= Marunchinos =

Almond cookies made by Sephardi Jews for Passover

- Alternative names: מרוצ’ינוס, Marunchino, merunchinos, Sephardi macaroon, Spanish macaroon
- Type: Cookie
- Place of origin: Spain, Israel, Mediterranean
- Region or state: Levant
- Created by: Sephardi Jews
- Serving temperature: room temp
- Main ingredients: Ground almonds, Eggs, sugar/honey, dried apricots, orange blossom water, icing sugar
- Variations: Macaroon, hadji bada

Marunchinos (Hebrew: מרוצ’ינוס), also known as Sephardi macaroons, is a popular Israeli cookie of Sephardi Jewish origin made with ground blanched almonds or almond flour, egg whites, sugar or more traditionally honey, spices, and oftentimes dried fruit and orange blossom or rose water, that is traditionally made during Passover (Pesach), as it is one of the few desserts which is unleavened and does not contain chametz (wheat and similar grains).

== History ==
The more commonly known Jewish macaroons are descended from the Sephardi marunchinos and the similar Sephardi almendredas. According to historian David Gitlitz, during the Spanish Inquisition, crypto-Jews were accused of having bought marunchinos from the Jewish quarter in Barbastro, in Aragón. The modern Jewish macaroon is a French Jewish descendant of marunchinos, specifically associated with Boulay, a town about twenty-five miles north of Nancy, France.

Marunchinos originated among the Sephardi Jewish community of Spain at some point prior to the Spanish Inquisition of 1492. There are several similar Jewish cookies in other Jewish communities, which are commonly baked both during Passover and all year, such as egg kichel, macaroons, and many others. In the aftermath the inquisition and subsequent exile of the Sephardi Jews to North Africa, Israel, the Middle East, Western Europe and the New World; the Sephardim brought with them their culinary traditions to their new homes and continued to bake them as part of their Passover celebrations. When cane sugar was brought back to Europe, North Africa and the Middle East in the 1500s, it began to gradually supplant the traditional use of honey in most marunchinos recipes. Sephardi Jews who remained in the Mediterranean region often added orange blossom water and dried fruit such as apricots, while Sephardim living in nations such as the UK and Holland, as well as the New World, would often make a plainer cookie with just ground almonds, egg whites and sugar and dusted with icing sugar.

== Overview ==
Marunchinos are a small, round white to light golden-colored cookie. They are made with blanched almonds that have been ground to a meal, egg whites, and either honey or more commonly sugar, as well as a variety of additions such as dried apricots, orange blossom water, rose water, pistachios, or lemon zest. They are often dusted with powdered sugar after baking.

Marunchinos are associated with the celebration of the Jewish holiday Pesach. It is a common custom in Israel for Sephardi families to bake marunchinos and serve them at the Passover seder.

Marunchinos are commonly baked at home and are also available from bakeries across Israel, as well as in the Jewish diaspora in countries such as at United Kingdom, and in cities such as Houston, Texas, during the Passover season.
