= Amaretto (disambiguation) =

Amaretto is an almond-flavored Italian liqueur.

Amaretto may also refer to:

- An almond-flavored cookie (plural: amaretti), also called a macaroon:
  - Almond macaron, an almond biscuit (cookie)
    - Amaretti di Saronno, biscuits (cookies) from Saronno in Lombardy, Italy
    - Amaretti di Mombaruzzo, speciality biscuits (cookies) of Piedmontese cuisine

== See also ==
- Amaro (liqueur)
- "Amaretto" as a flavouring, derived from several sources:
  - Amygdalin
  - Benzaldehyde
  - Orgeat syrup
- Biscotti biscuits (cookies), sometimes almond, traditional in Italy
- Frangipane, almond filling
