= Hadji bada =

Almond cookies made by Iraqi Jews for Passover

- Alternative names: Iraqi Jewish almond cookies, Iraqi almond cookies, Babylonian almond cookies, Iraqi macaroon
- Type: Cookie
- Place of origin: Iraq, Iran India, Israel, United Kingdom
- Region or state: Babylon and Bombay
- Created by: Iraqi Jews
- Serving temperature: room temp
- Main ingredients: Ground almonds and/or walnuts, eggs, sugar/honey, ground cardamom, cinnamon, garam masala, rose water, icing sugar
- Variations: Marunchinos

Hadji bada, also known as Iraqi Jewish almond cookies, is a cookie of Sephardi Jewish origin made with ground blanched almonds or walnuts, egg whites, sugar or more traditionally honey, spices, and oftentimes topped with whole almonds and infused with rose water, that is traditionally made during Passover (Pesach), as it is one of the few desserts which is unleavened and does not contain chametz (wheat and similar grains).

== History ==
Hadji bada originated among the Iraqi Jewish community in Babylon at some point in ancient times. Similar cookies are attested in Jewish culinary tradition dating back thousands of years and existed in Jewish communities around the world, including the marunchinos and Ashkenazi macaroons, which points to a shared ancient Israelite origin, as the ingredients common to these similar Jewish almond cookies, almond, egg and honey/sugar/date syrup, were relatively abundant in Israel and the Levant. There are several similar Jewish cookies in other Jewish communities, which are commonly baked both during Passover and all year, such as egg kichel, macaroons, and many others. In the aftermath of the persecution and subsequent exile of the Iraqi Jews to the UK, Israel, India, Hong Kong, Singapore, and other parts of the former British Empire; the Iraqi Jews brought with them their culinary traditions to their new homes and continued to bake them as part of their Passover celebrations. When cane sugar was brought back to Europe, South Asia, and the Middle East in the 1500s, it began to gradually supplant the traditional use of honey in most hadji bada recipes. Iraqi Jews who remained in Iraq and the Indian subcontinent often only used almonds and added rose water, while Iraqi Jews living in nations such as the UK and USA, as well as the New World, would often make a plainer cookie with just ground almonds and walnuts, egg whites, cinnamon and sugar and dusted with icing sugar.

== Overview ==
Hadji bada is a small, round white to light golden-colored cookie. They are made with blanched almonds and/or walnuts that have been ground to a meal, egg whites, and either honey or more commonly sugar, as well as a variety of additions such as a whole almond in the centre, rose water, pistachios, cardamom, or cinnamon. They are often dusted with powdered sugar after baking.

Hadji bada is associated with the celebration of the Jewish holiday Pesach. It is a common custom in Israel for Iraqi Jewish families to bake hadji bada and serve them at the Passover seder. Variations of this cookie are made with very different ingredients such as flour or coconut in lieu of the ground nuts, but go by the same name, hadji bada, are traditionally made by Iraqi and Persian Jews to celebrate Purim.

Hadji bada are commonly baked at home and are also available from bakeries across Israel, as well as in the Iraqi Jewish diaspora in countries such as at United Kingdom, Singapore, and in cities such as London and Hong Kong.

== See also ==
- List of cookies
- Jewish cuisine
