= Kluski =

Polish name for dumplings, noodles and pasta

- Course: Appetizer, main, dessert
- Place of origin: Poland
- Serving temperature: Hot
- Main ingredients: Unleavened dough
- Variations: minced meat

Kluski (singular: klusek or kluska; from German Klöße) are soft Polish dumplings of various sorts, usually without filling.

There are many different types of kluski, differing in basic ingredients and preparation method. Kluski are distinct from pierogi and stand-alone pasta dishes.

== Varieties ==
=== Kopytka ===
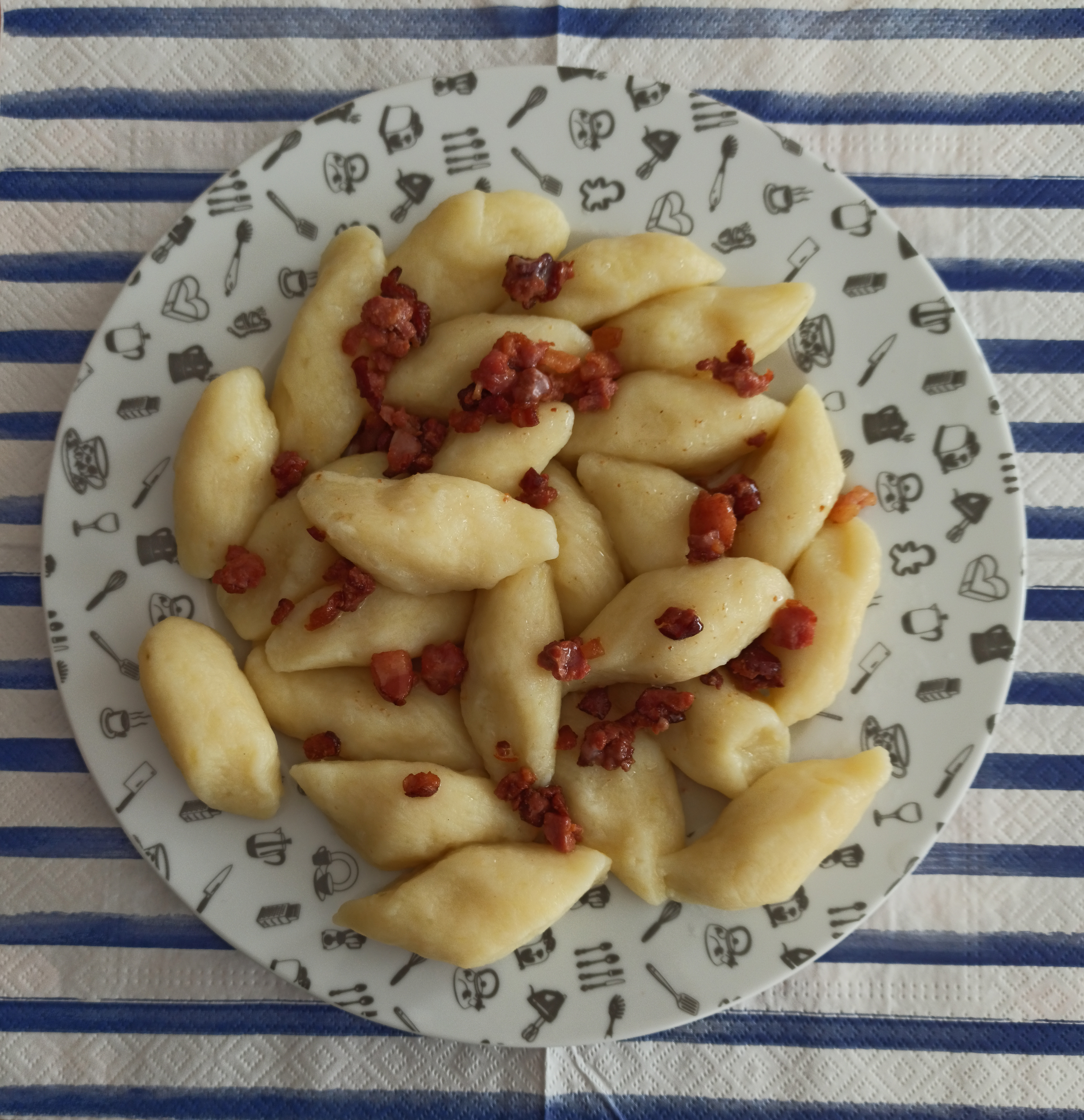
Kopytka

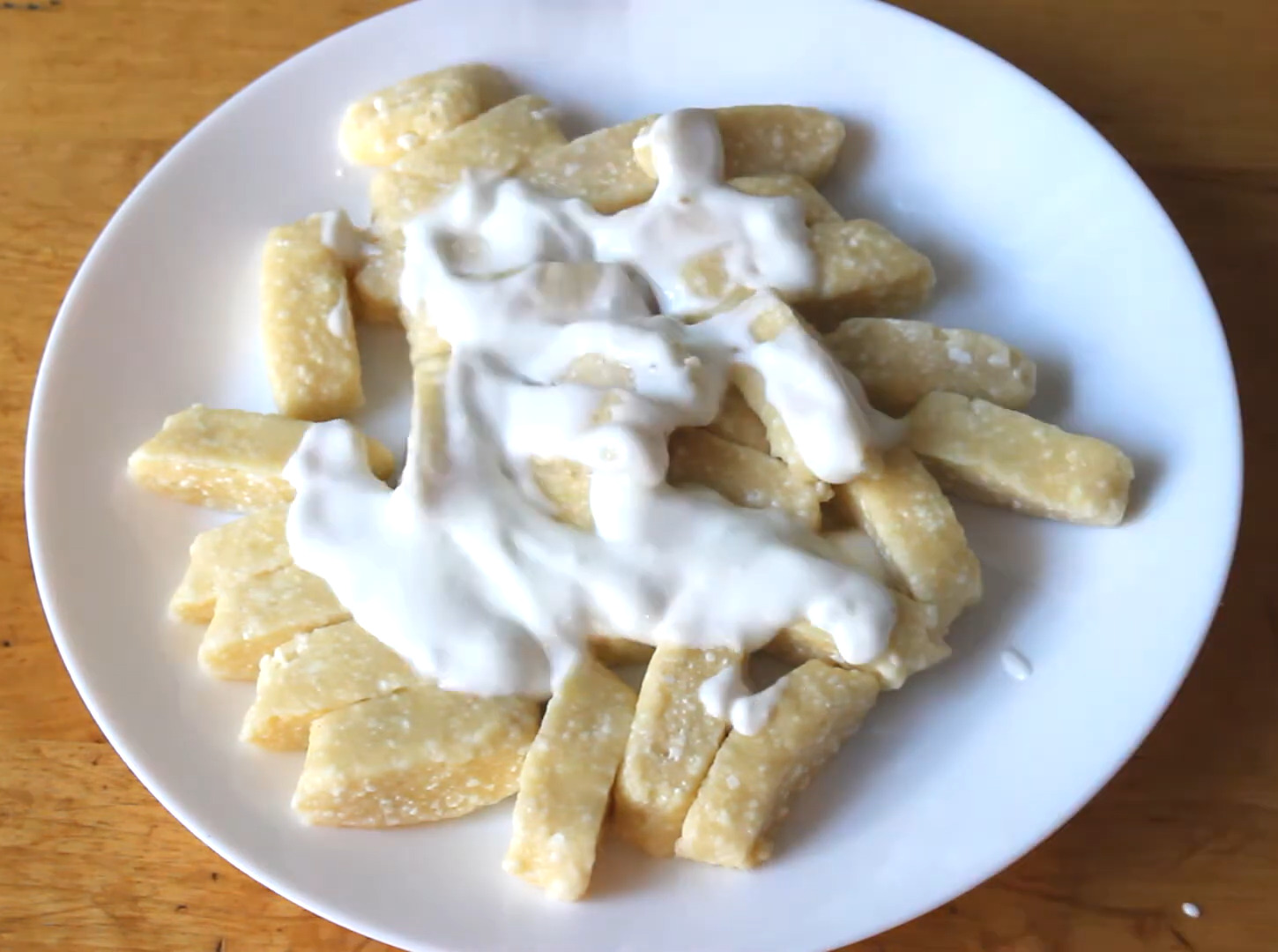
Kluski leniwe with yoghurt

Kopytka ("little hooves") are prepared from cooked mashed potatoes, flour, and eggs. They are similar to Italian gnocchi, differing mostly in shape, as they are supposed to resemble animal hooves. They can be eaten by themselves (served with sauces or simple garnishes such as butter or cracklings) or with meat dishes (such as goulash).

=== Kluski leniwe ===
Kluski leniwe ("lazy dumplings") or pierogi leniwe (despite being a type of kluski rather than pierogi) are made from fresh cheese (twaróg), flour, and eggs, and often sweetened with sugar. They are flat and cut diagonally into diamonds - a shape similar to that of kopytka (see above). They are almost always eaten with a very simple garnish - usually sweet (just sugar, cream and sugar, sugar and cinnamon, etc.), but there are savory recipes as well (butter, bread crumbs, etc.).

=== Kluski śląskie ===
Kluski śląskie ("Silesian dumplings") are round, flattened dumplings with the size ranging from 3 centimeters to 5 centimeters, made from mashed potatoes, potato flour, and eggs. Usually served with gravy, their distinctive feature is a small hole or dimple in the middle. Kluski czarne ("black dumplings"), also known as kluski żelazne ("iron dumplings") or kluski szare ("gray dumplings"), is a variety of kluski śląskie popular in Upper Silesia. In addition to mashed potatoes and flour, grated potatoes are added to the dough, giving it a distinctive color. In regions where these are popular, both white and black dumplings are served at the same meal.

=== Kluski lane ===
Kluski lane ("poured noodles"), a very thin variety formed by pouring watery batter made from eggs and flour into boiling water or directly into soup.

=== Kluski kładzione ===
Kluski kładzione ("laid dumplings"), a variety made from eggs, milk and flour, formed into crescent-shaped forms by scraping thick dough with the tip of a tablespoon and then laying the chunk onto boiling water. Soda water is sometimes added to the dough.

=== Pampuchy ===
Pampuchy, also known as pyzy drożdżowe ("yeast pyzy"), kluski drożdżowe ("yeast dumplings"), kluski na parze ("steamed dumplings"), or regionally kluchy z łacha ("dumplings from a rag") or in Silesia buchty (not to be confused with rolls of the same name), differ from other varieties in being prepared from leavened yeast dough and steamed rather than boiled. They might be distantly related to Czech knedliky (from German Knödel) and they resemble mantou, Chinese steamed buns. In some regions, they are often served with sweet toppings, such as melted butter and sugar, or a sauce from strawberries or plum powidła. In Greater Poland, where they are usually referred to as simply as pyzy, they are typically served with meat- or mushroom-based sauces.

=== Pyzy ziemniaczane ===
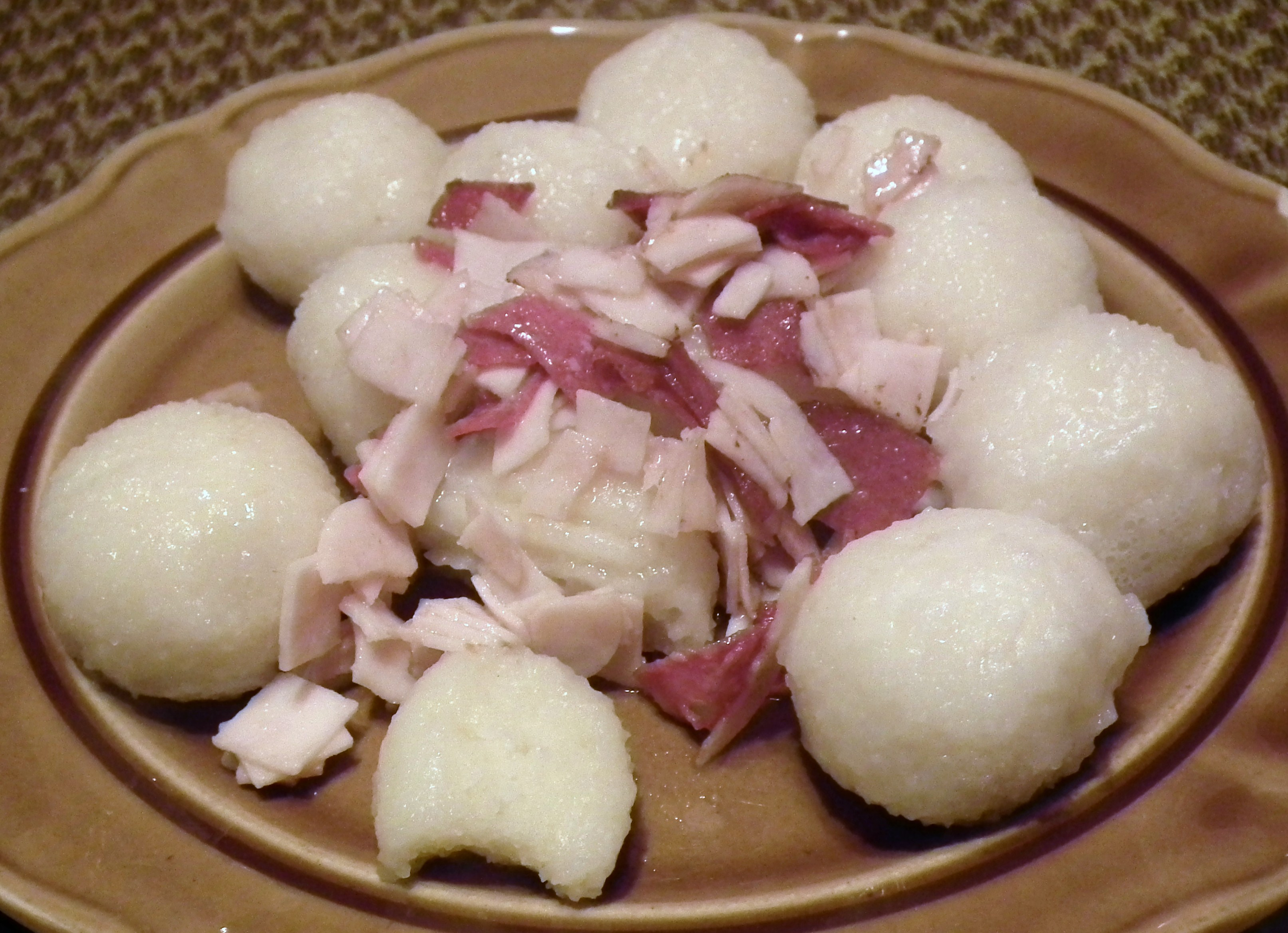
Pyzy ziemniaczane with bacon/lard

Pyzy ziemniaczane ("potato pyzy"), the only category of kluski with a filling, made from raw (or a mixture of both raw and mashed) potatoes, flour and eggs. These are usually larger than other kluski, round, with either savory or sweet filling. The savory ones vary wildly by the region. One such variety are kartacze, also known as cepeliny, popular in North East Poland and the national dish of the neighboring Lithuania.

=== Knedle ===
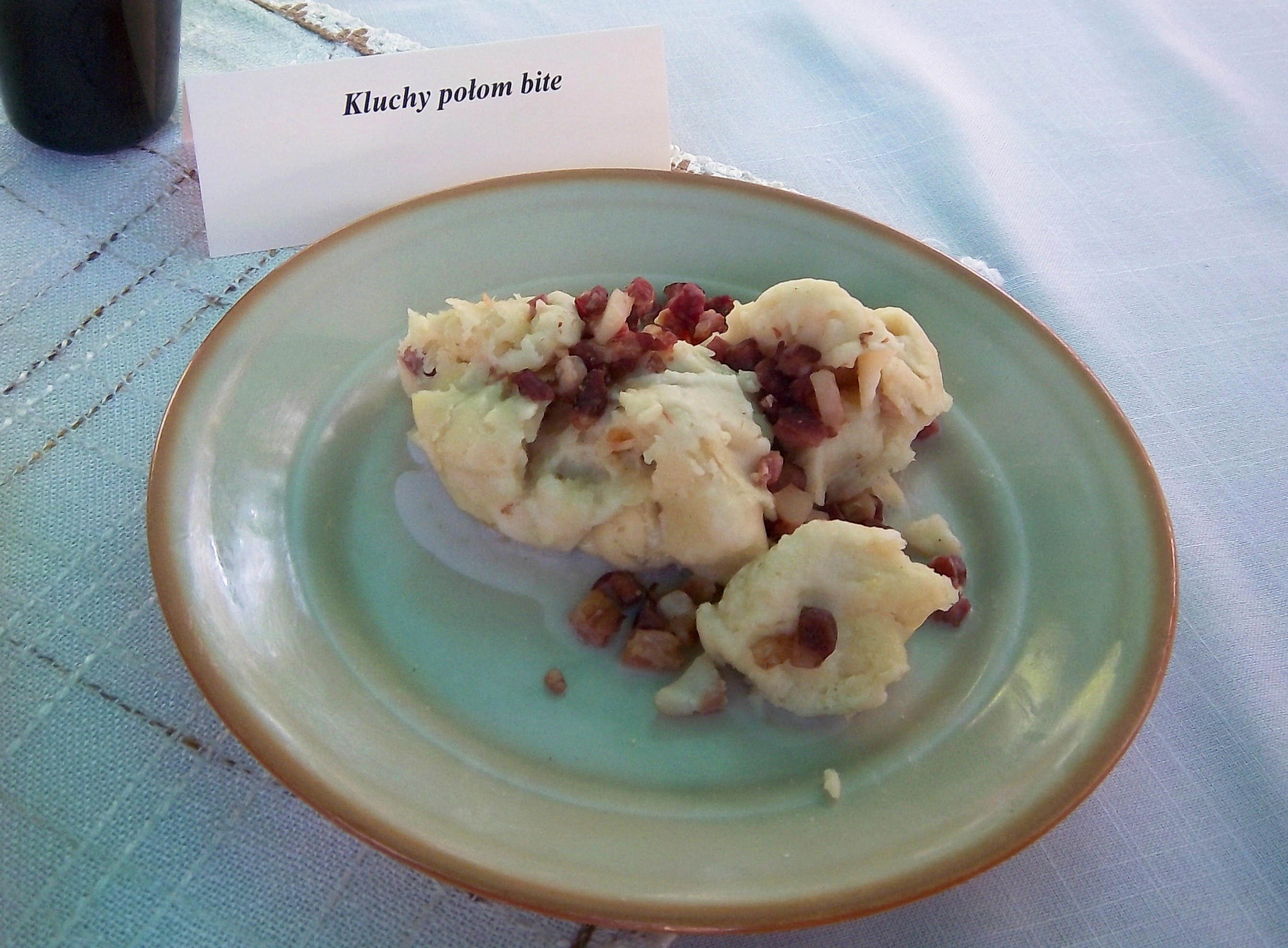
Kluchy połom bite

Knedle is a term which definition depends on the region or personal interpretation. Many use this name simply for any stuffed dumpling that is round or oblong (a shape different than that of the classic pierogi). For some, they are identical with pyzy ziemniaczane (see above) but sweet rather than savory. Others distinguish pyzy as made with raw, and knedle with cooked potatoes - and therefore similar to kluski śląskie (see above), but with stuffing. The word itself comes from German, and in Germany and Austria, the definition and interpretation of knödel also differs depending on the region.

=== Kluchy połom bite ===
Kluchy połom bite, also known as prażucha ziemniaczana or fusier, are a regional potato-based variation characteristic for Gmina Kroczyce in Jura (historical Lesser Poland).

== See also ==
- Butsyky (food), a similar Ukrainian dish
- Klöße, a similar German dish
- Halušky, a similar dish popular in Central and Eastern Europe
- Nokedli, a similar Hungarian dish
