= Kluchy połom bite =

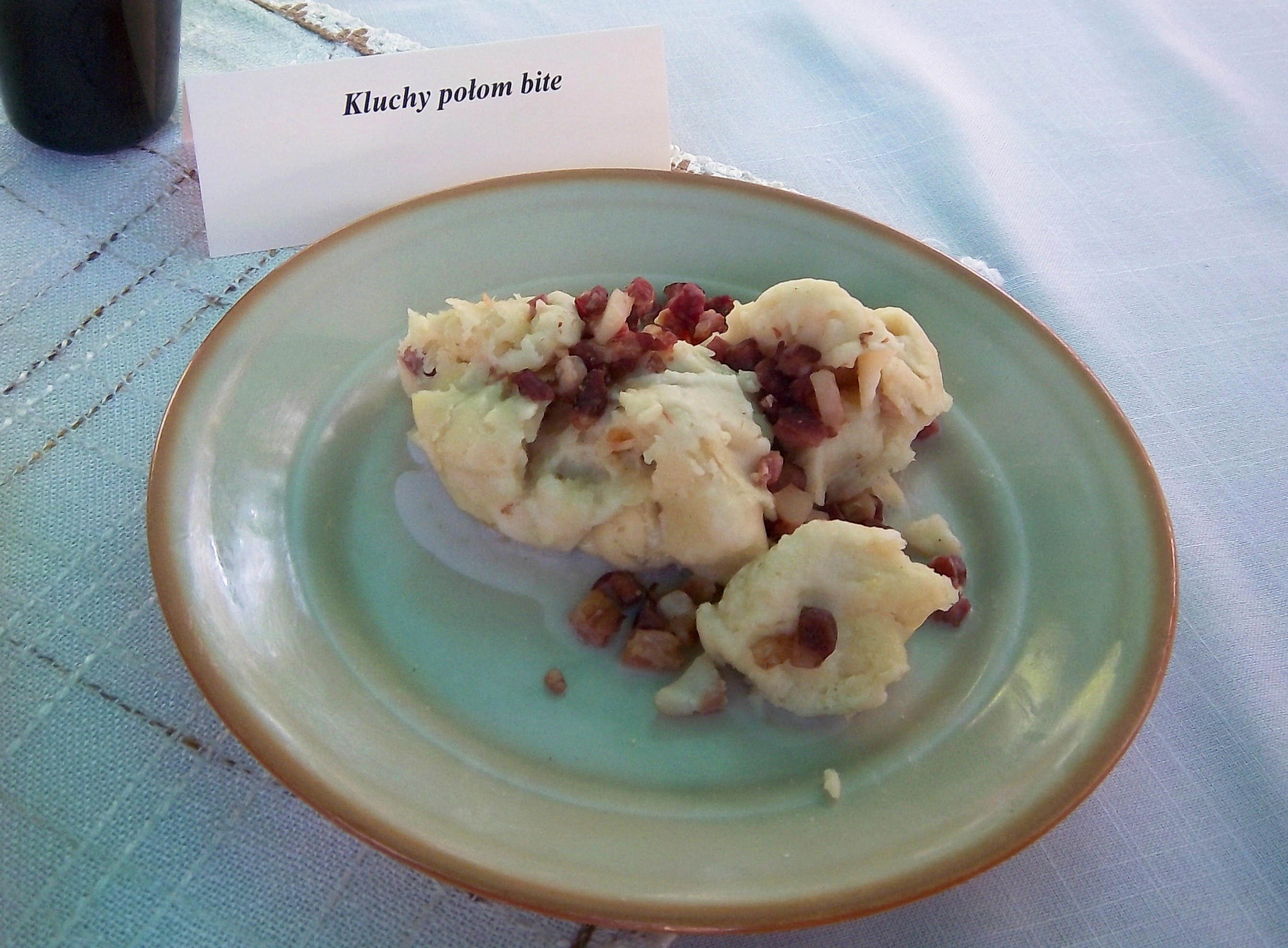
- Kluchy połom bite in Chorzów
- Type: Dumpling
- Course: Main
- Place of origin: Poland
- Serving temperature: Hot
- Main ingredients: Potatoes, flour

In Polish cuisine, kluchy połom bite is a traditional and regional kluski made from specially whipped potatoes entwined with flour, characteristic for the Gmina Kroczyce. In other regions of Poland the dish is known by other names, including prażucha ziemniaczana and fusier.

The main ingredient for the dish is peeled, lightly boiled potatoes, that are salted and covered with flour, after which the flour is roasted ("prażona" in Polish, hence the name, "prażucha"). The resulting mass is whipped with a special stick (połka) (hence Polish: "połom bite", "whipped with poł") with a flat bottom, until the mass is uniformly smooth. The kluski have an irregular shape, one which is formed only when it is taken out of the pot for serving. The meat is generally served as a main course dish, served with bacon or alternatively lard, with pickled cucumber or soured milk.

== See also ==
- Silesian cuisine
