= Karminadle =

Polish meatballs associated with Silesia

- Alternative names: Gehaktyz, karbinadle, kardinadle
- Type: Meatball
- Course: Main
- Place of origin: Silesia, Poland
- Serving temperature: Hot
- Main ingredients: Pork

Karminadle (plural; singular: karminadel), gehaktyz, karbinadle, or kardinadle, is a Silesian dish, meatballs traditionally prepared from pork. When served with potato pureé, kasza or rice, they constitute a traditional Upper Silesian karminadle.

Generally, karminadle are small, round and often flattened cutlets made from pork or a combination of pork and beef, although more commonly historically from rabbit meat, due to the ongoing rabbit breeding tradition in Upper Silesia. Karminadle used to be a holiday-only dish, but it is now an everyday, all-year food item.

Karminadle, sliced in half, may be served cold on bread or bread rolls.

== See also ==
- Polish cuisine
- Silesian cuisine
