= Pierogi leniwe =

Polish dumplings

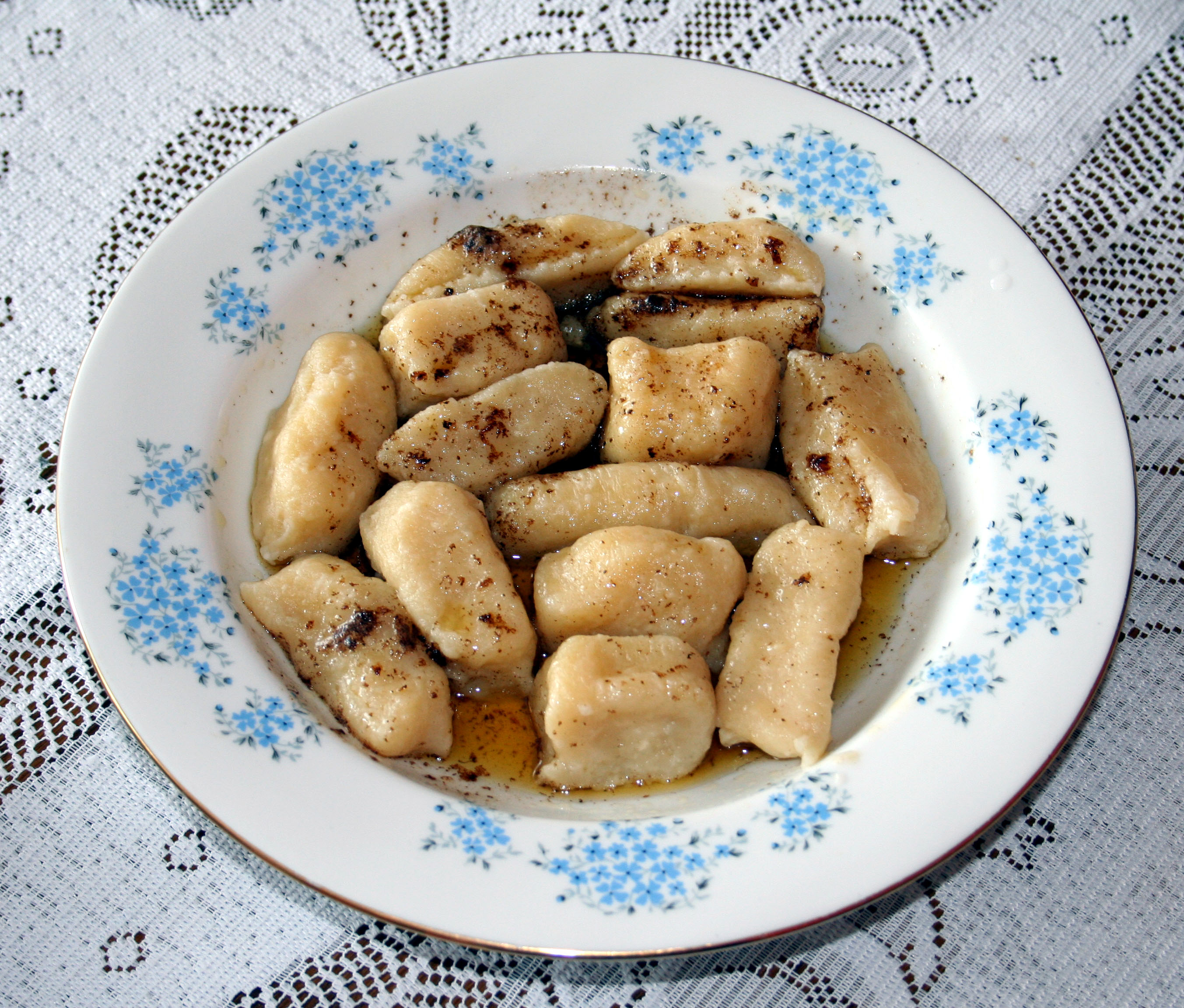
- Pierogi leniwe with cinnamon
- Alternative names: Leniwe
- Type: Dumpling
- Course: Main
- Place of origin: Poland, Ukraine
- Serving temperature: Hot
- Main ingredients: Twaróg, eggs, flour,

Pierogi leniwe, leniwe (literally "lazy dumplings"), linyvi varenyky (Ukrainian: ліниві вареники) are dumplings made of quark, eggs and flour, boiled in lightly salted water. They are most frequently served with sour cream or sugar, or may be bespeckled with butter, fried bread crumbs, as well as with sugar and cinnamon.

== See also ==
- Kluski
- Polish cuisine
