= Silesian cuisine =

Culinary traditions of the Silesia region

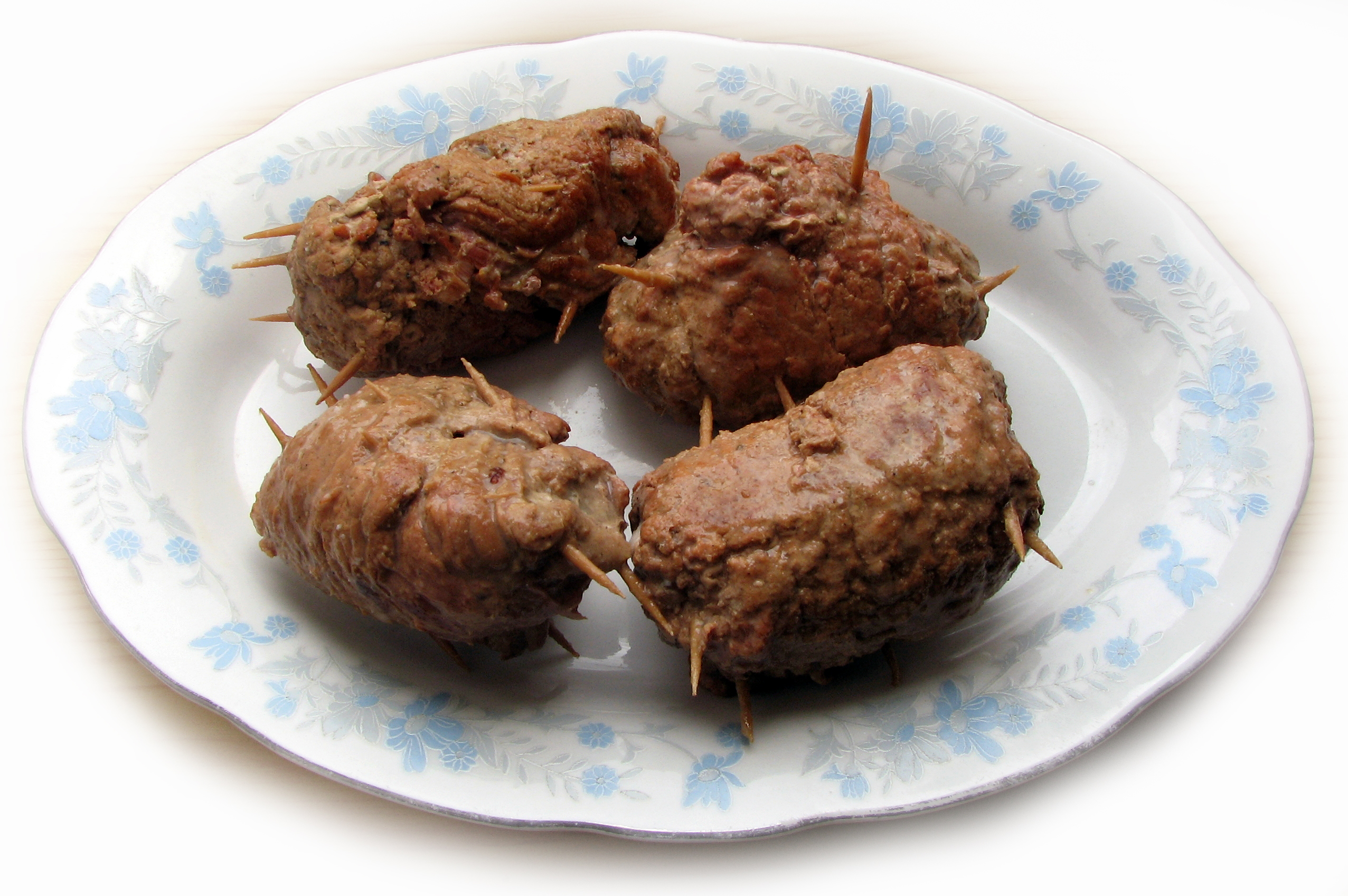
Rouladen

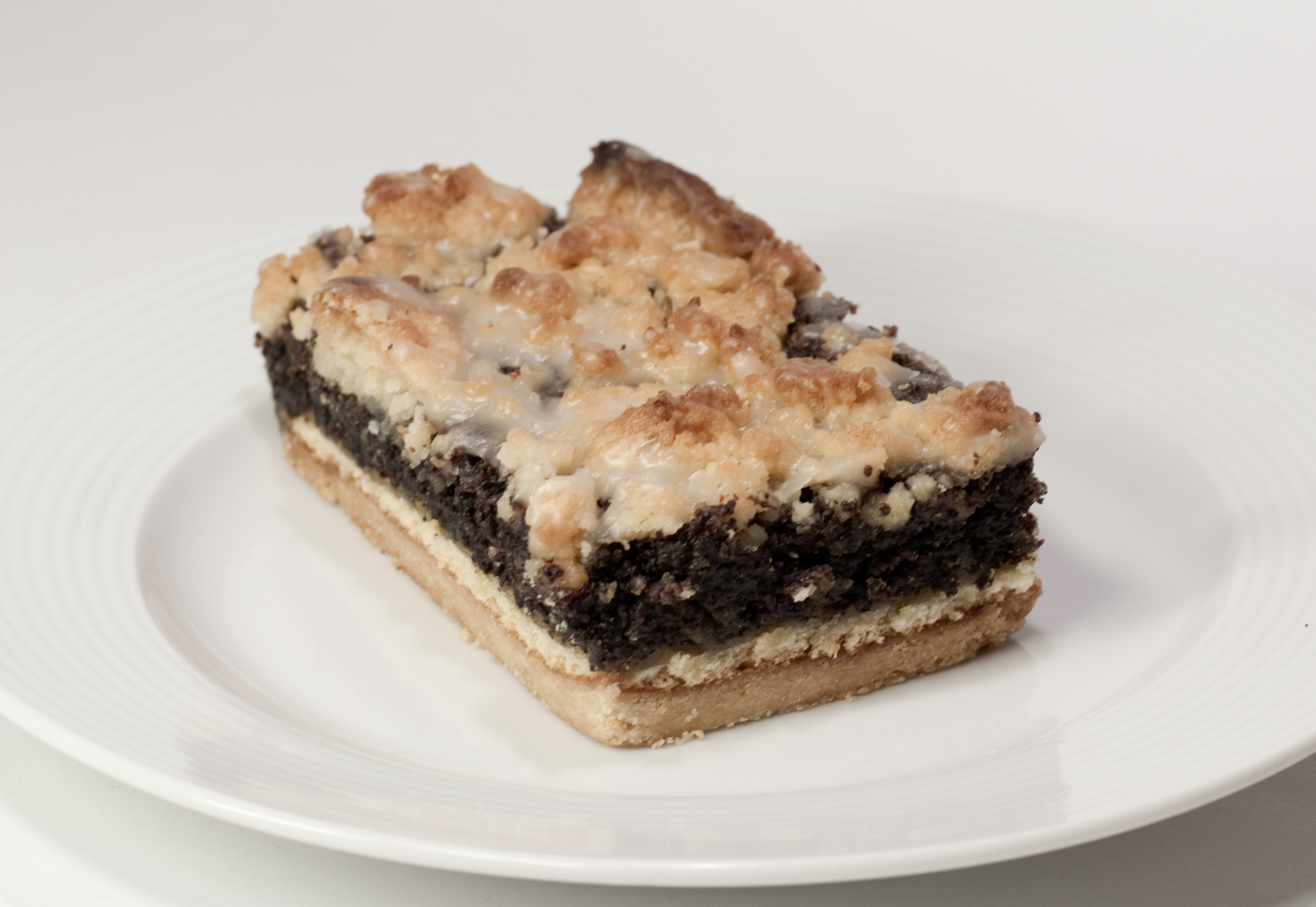
Poppy seed cake (makowiec)

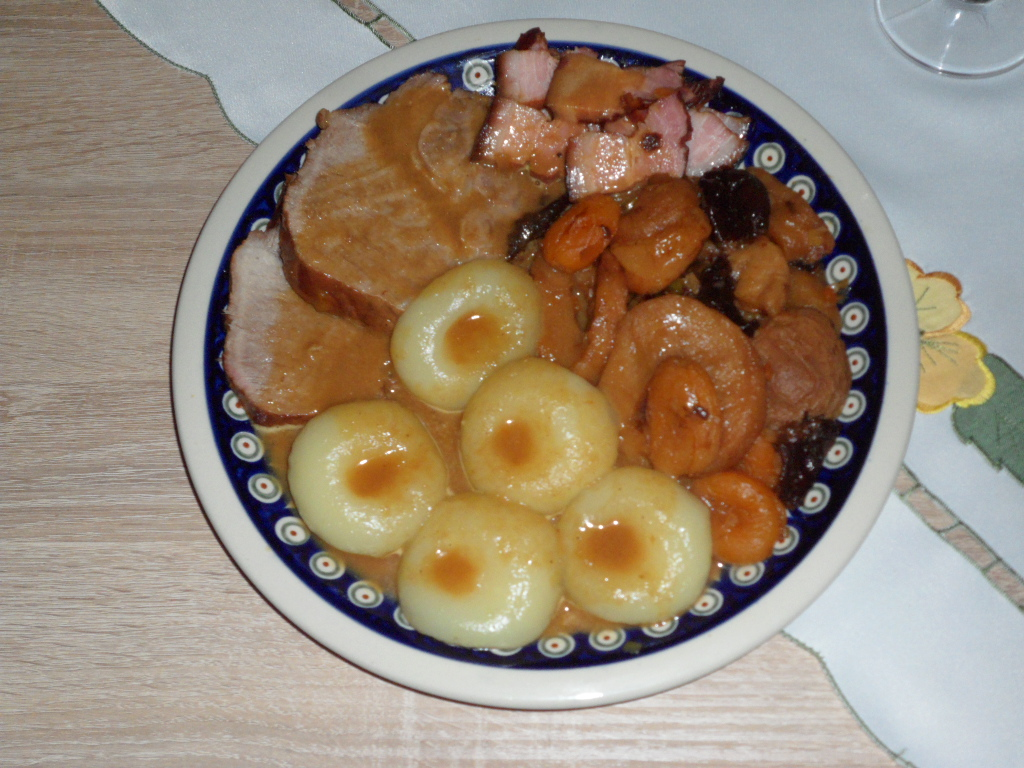
Schlesisches Himmelreich

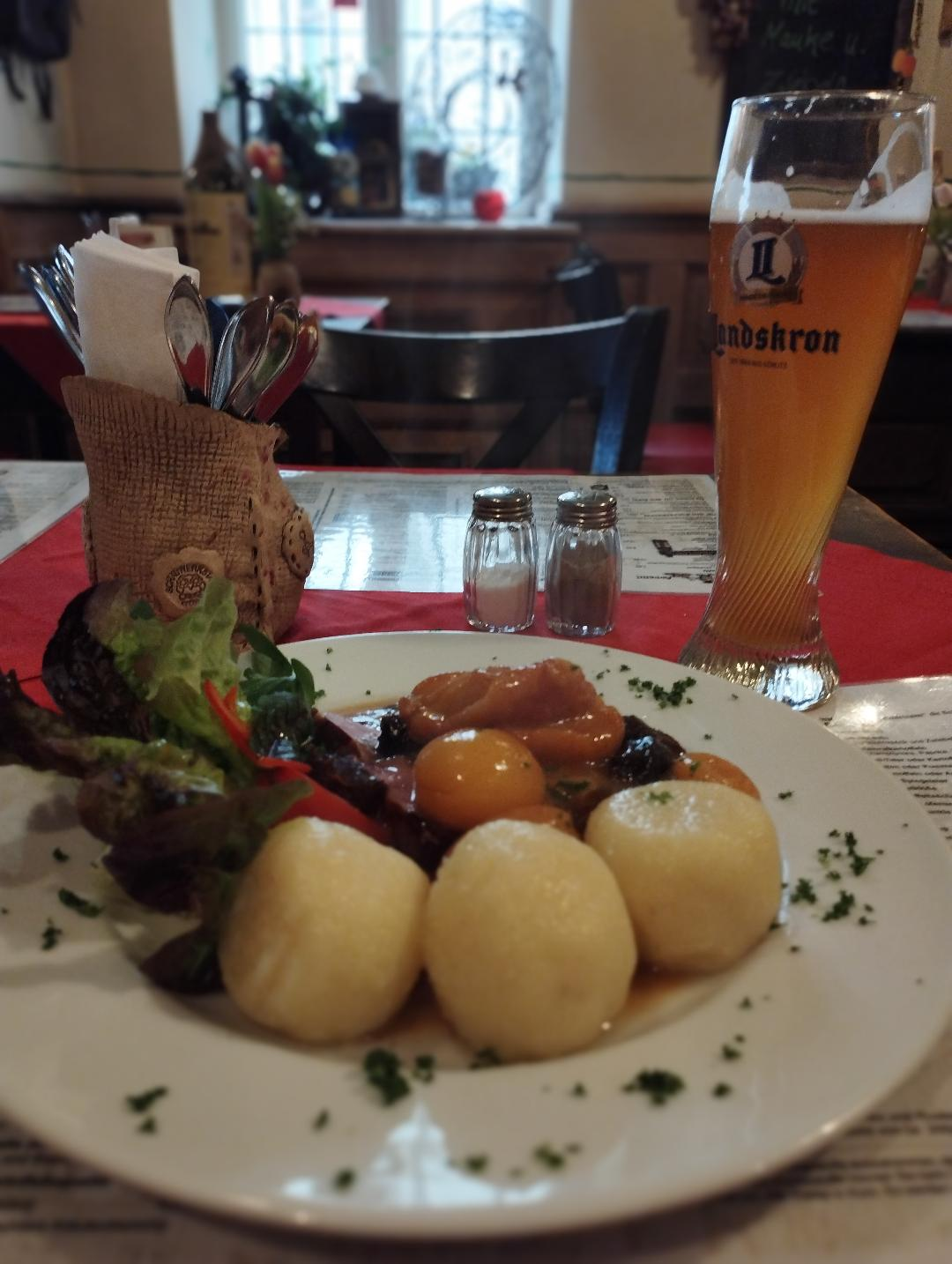
Small portion of 'Silesian Haven'

Silesian cuisine belongs to the region of Silesia in Central Europe. It is a subtype of Polish cuisine with many similarities to and signs of the influence of neighbouring cuisines. The cuisine is particularly renowned for its poppy seed and knödel dishes.

== List of Silesian dishes ==
- Hauskyjza - strongly flavored, home-made cheese with caraway seeds
- Kaszanka/Krupniok/Grützwurst - a type of blood sausage made of kasha and animal blood
- Kluski śląskie/Schlesische Kartoffelklöße (Silesian dumplings) - round dumplings served with gravy, made of mashed boiled potatoes, finely grated raw potatoes, an egg, grated onion, wheat flour, and potato flour
- Knysza - pita bread filled with meat and cabbage
- Kopalnioki - hard candies made of sugar, anise oil, and the essences of St John's wort, melissa, and peppermint, its black colour comes from charcoal food dye.
- Liegnitzer Bombe/Bōmba Legniczno - small chocolate-covered gingerbread cakes filled with marzipan and fruit or nuts, historically a speciality of Legnica (Liegnitz)
- Makówki/Mohnpielen - traditional Christmas Eve dessert, based on finely ground poppy seeds, with raisins, almonds, candied citrus peels, honey, sugar, and pudding, and flavoured with rum
- Moczka/Motschka/Lebkuchensauce/Polnische Sauce - a traditional Christmas Eve dessert, its main ingredients are gingerbread extract, nuts and dried fruit, strawberry compote, and almonds.
- Rolada z modrą kapustą (rouladen with red cabbage) - best-quality beef-meat roll; stuffed with pickled vegetable, ham, and good amount of seasoning; always served with red cabbage (with fried bacon, fresh onion and allspice); traditionally eaten with kluski śląskie for Sunday dinner
- Schlesisches Himmelreich/Sylezyjske Niebo ("Silesian Heaven") - a dish of smoked pork cooked in water with dried fruit and spices
- Siemieniotka/Hanfsuppe - soup made of hemp seed, a main Christmas Eve meal
- Streuselkuchen/Kołocz śląski - made of a yeast dough covered with a sweet crumb
- Szałot - a salad made of cubes of boiled potatoes and carrots, peas, ham, various sausages, pickled fish, boiled eggs, seasoned with olive oil or mayonnaise
- Wodzionka/Brotsuppe - soup with garlic and cubes of dried rye bread
- Żymła - a well-baked bread roll, oval with a division in the middle, topped with poppy seeds, similar to Austrian Kaisersemmel.
- Żymlok - like krupniok but instead of kasha, bread roll (żymła) is used
