= Lazzaroni =

Italian bakery producer

D. Lazzaroni & C. S.p.A.
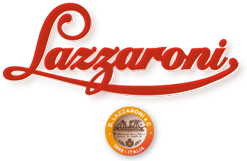
- Type: Joint stock company
- Industry: Italian food
- Founded: 1888
- Founder: Giacinto, Piero ed Ernesto Lazzaroni
- Headquarters: Lainate, Italy
- Area served: Worldwide
- Products: Bakery products
- Revenue: ▲€ 28 million (2011)
- Owner: Gruppo Ragosta
- Number of employees: 146 (2010)
- Subsidiaries: France
- Website: www.lazzaronibiscotti.it

Lazzaroni (pronounced [laddzaˈroːni]) is the brand name related to several biscuits and bakery products manufactured by the Italian company D. Lazzaroni & C. Spa.

Lazzaroni is a well-known Italian brand thanks to products such as Amaretti di Saronno. Lazzaroni was the first Italian company to produce biscuits industrially, and has been marketing Lazzaroni branded biscuits and pastries since 1888.

== History ==
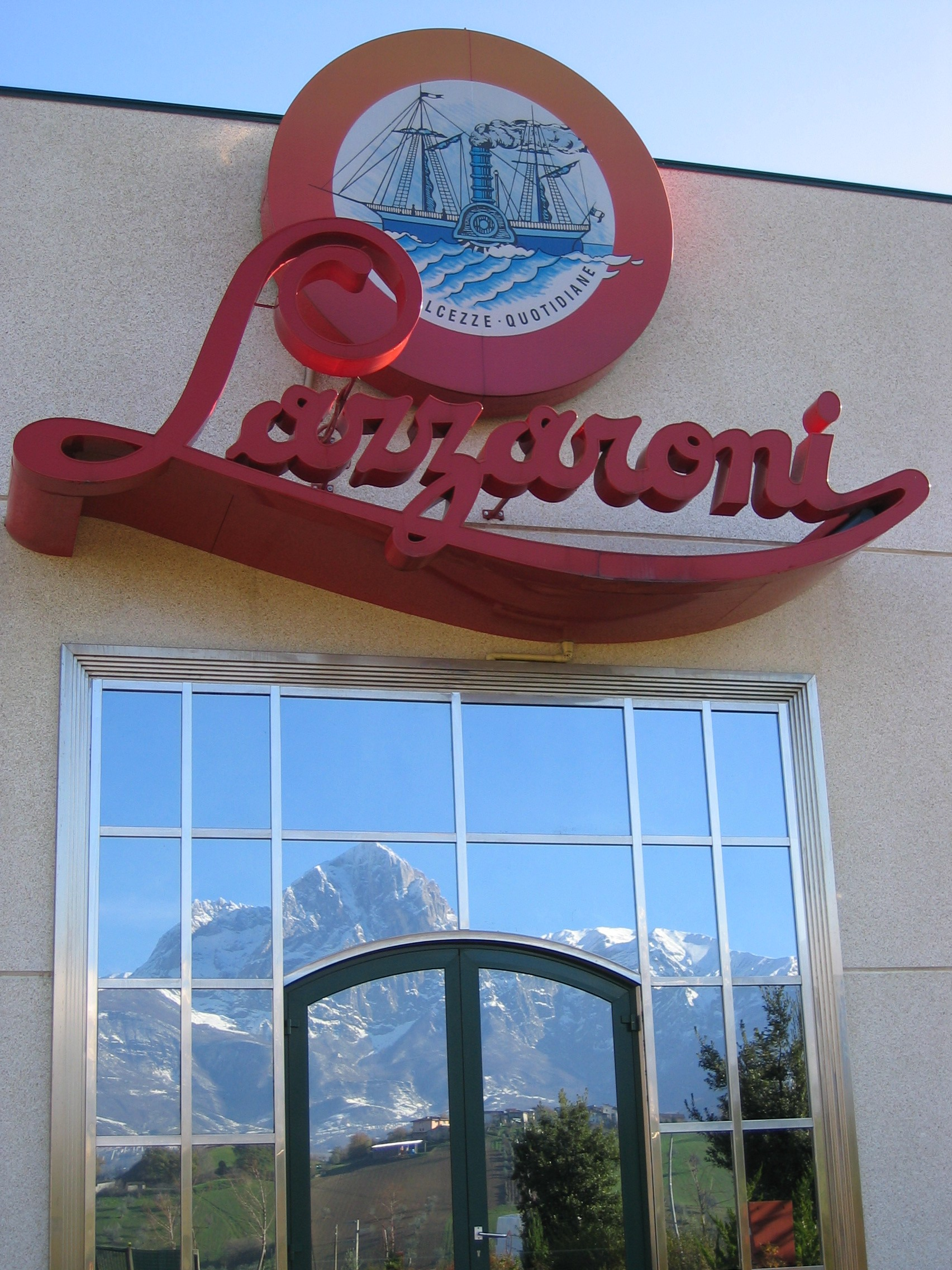
The manufacturing plant opened in 2004

The Lazzaroni family, led by Carlo Lazzaroni, moved from Valtellina to Saronno at the beginning of the 18th century, starting the artisanal production of Amaretti di Saronno. The business was continued by Carlo's sons Paolo and Davide. Paolo moved to Monza in the mid-19th century, starting the production of mostarda and liqueurs. Davide continued to produce amaretti, in Saronno in front of the cathedral, at that time served by horse transport. With the advent of the rail transport, Luigi Lazzaroni (son of Davide) joined the company and in 1888 the partners founded D. Lazzaroni & C., a new legal entity and a new manufacturing facility.

In the following years, the company enjoyed great success, making 350 different types of biscuits and exporting its products world-wide; this was symbolized by the brand logo, which included steam boat. It was in this period that biscuits such as Oswego, Nutritivo, Croccale and Germovita made their debut.

In 1984, the American multinational Campbell's acquired the firm in order to pursue an ambitious internationalization strategy. In 1991, the Italian firm Citterio, a producer of ham, salami and fresh pasta, acquired the company.

The nineties and the beginning of the 2000s saw ups and downs of the company, from financial difficulties to the relocation of production, which took place in 2004, to the Isola del Gran Sasso plant.

In 2008, the company was acquired by the Ragosta Group with the goal of rejuvenating the Lazzaroni brand after a strong restructuring process.

== Products ==
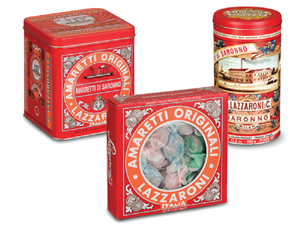
Amaretti di Saronno

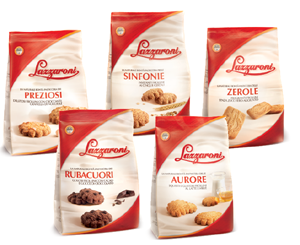
Frollini

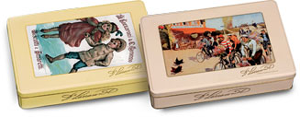
Vintage tin boxes

Lazzaroni's offers its traditional bakery products and the "original Amaretti di Saronno" (sold in the typical lithograph-decorated tin boxes), and many breakfast biscuits and cookies ("frollini"), pastries and pastry assortments. During the holidays, Lazzaroni also sells panettone of Milan and the Colomba Pasquale. In 2010, the company introduced a gluten-free product range.

== Cultural references ==
In the novel La caccia al tesoro by Andrea Camilleri, published in 2010, Inspector Montalbano receives an anonymous parcel containing a Lazzaroni lithographed box with the words "Fornitori della Real Casa" (literally "Suppliers of the Royal House") on it, a title formerly awarded to manufacturers who became official suppliers for the House of Savoy.

Also in 2010, some red tin boxes of Amaretti di Saronno appeared in a scene of the fantasy film Harry Potter and the Deathly Hallows – Part 1.

== See also ==
- List of Italian companies
