= Moczka =

Silesian Christmas dish

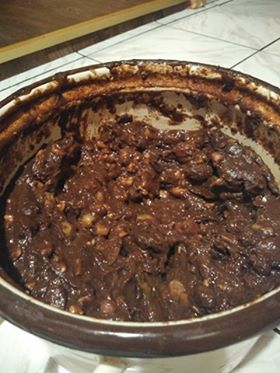
Moczka in a pot.

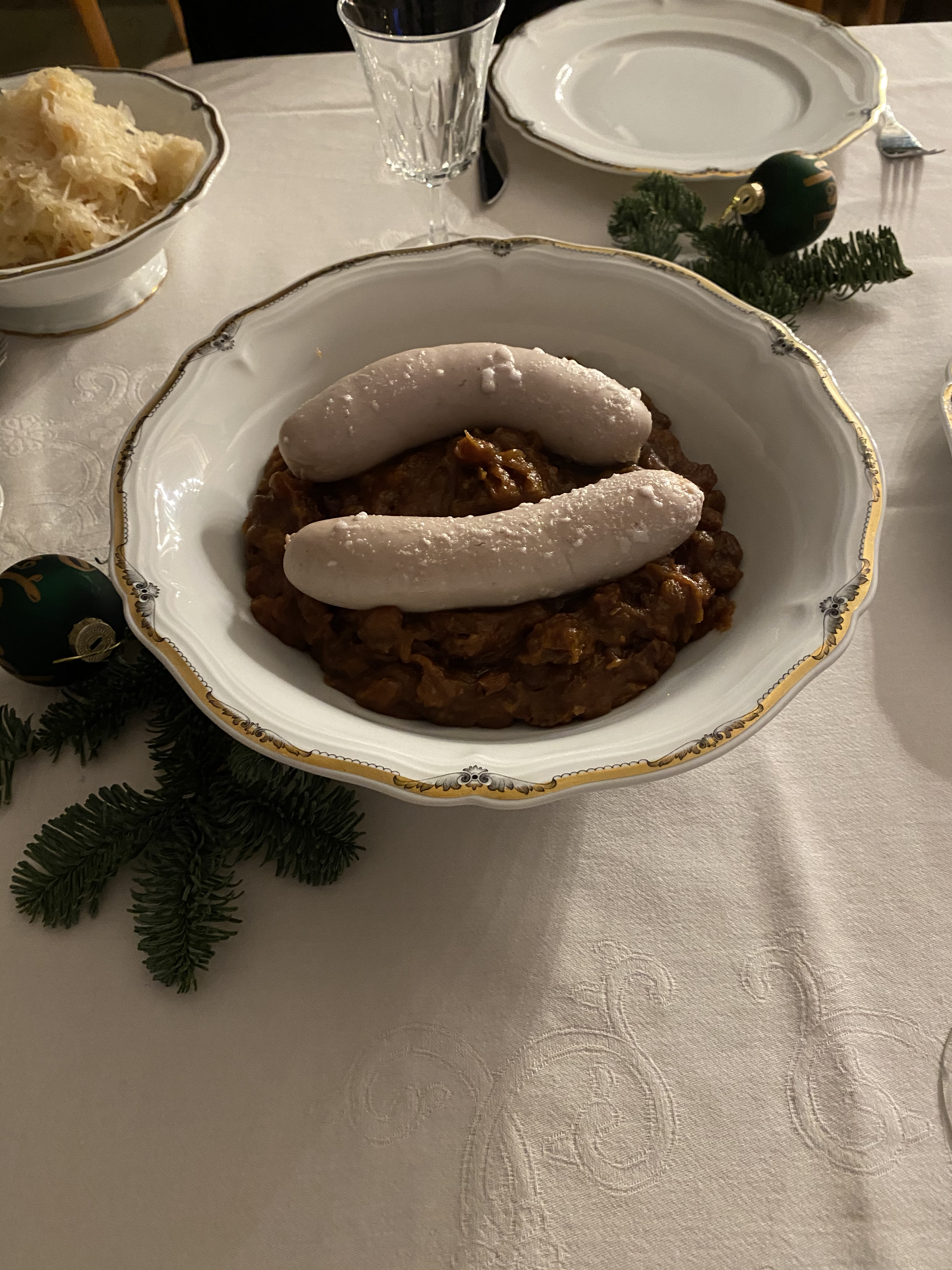
German style Polish Sauce with Silesian Weisswurst

Moczka [ˈmɔt͡ʂka] (otherwise bryja) is a Silesian dish prepared for Christmas.

It is prepared from a special type of gingerbread, almonds, raisins, dried plums, dried apricots, pears, dried figs, dried dates, hazelnuts and a large amount of dark beer in which the ingredients are soaked. Instead of beer, a vegetable or vegetable broth was used on the heads of carp.

In every part of Silesia, the list for the moczka is different, mainly differs by additions, but gingerbread remains the basis of the dish. In many German families with roots in the former German-speaking parts of Silesia, Moczka is also served as a dish on Christmas Eve and has the name ″Lebkuchensauce″ (gingerbread sauce) or ″Polnische Sauce″ (Polish sauce).

With time, the recipe for the moczka changed. Today it can be made without adding beer, with fruit and compotes so that the moczka is sweet and did not resemble vegetable soup with fruit.
