= Varenyky =

Traditional Ukrainian stuffed dumplings

- Boiled Ukrainian varenyky with smetana, a traditional presentation found across Ukraine
- Alternative names: Warenyky, wareniki, vareniki, pyrohy, krepli (Western Ukraine, dialectal), kolduny (rare regional usage)
- Type: Dumpling
- Course: Main course, dessert
- Place of origin: Ukraine
- Region or state: Eastern Europe
- Serving temperature: Hot
- Main ingredients: Flour, water or milk, various fillings
- Similar dishes: Pierogi

Varenyky (Ukrainian: вареники, sing.: varenyk) are traditional Ukrainian dumplings made from unleavened dough and filled with sweet or savoury ingredients. They are regarded as one of the most emblematic dishes of Ukrainian cuisine and are closely related to other East European dumplings such as Polish pierogi. A key distinction made between the Ukrainian varenyky and the Polish pierogi is that the former has thinner, softer dough and traditionally simpler filling, most often only consisting of potato.

== Etymology ==
The term вареники (varenyky) derives from the Ukrainian verb варити (varyty, 'to boil'), referring to their primary cooking method.

== History ==
Varenyky have been documented in Ukrainian culinary traditions for centuries and appear in folklore, ritual practices, and literature. They were commonly prepared for festive occasions, harvest celebrations, and religious holidays.

References to varenyky appear in Ukrainian folk songs and humour, where the dish symbolises abundance, warmth, and hospitality.

== Steamed varenyky ==
In addition to the commonly boiled form, some regional traditions include steamed varenyky (pareni varenyky or pyrohy na parí). In western Ukrainian regions, including Hutsul areas, dumplings are prepared by placing them on a cloth stretched over a pot of boiling water and steaming them until soft. This traditional method produces a delicate texture and is often associated with potato and cheese fillings.

Steamed dumplings are mentioned in Ukrainian cookbooks, which describe steaming as a customary technique in certain high-altitude and festive culinary traditions.

== Serving ==
Varenyky are served with:

- Sour cream (smetana)
- Melted butter
- Fried onions
- Fried pieces of salo (shkvarky)
- Sugar (for sweet versions)

The traditional use of sour cream and onions is noted in ethnographic studies of Ukrainian foodways.

== Regional variations ==
Different Ukrainian regions favour specific fillings:

- Western Ukraine: potato–cheese and fruit varenyky
- Central Ukraine: cabbage and mushroom fillings
- Southern Ukraine: meat-filled versions

Meatless varieties are customary on Christmas Eve.

== Cultural significance ==
Varenyky hold symbolic meaning in Ukrainian culture and appear in folk art, songs, and humour. They are often associated with prosperity and family traditions.

A monument dedicated to varenyky was erected in Cherkasy Oblast, highlighting the dish's cultural popularity.

In Ukrainian tradition, varenyky were equated with a young moon due to the similar shape, and were used as part of pagan and sacrificial rituals. For example, cheese varenyky would be sacrificed near water springs, and farmers would also believe that varenyky helped bring a rich harvest, so they took homemade dumplings with them to the fields.

== See also ==
- Butsyky (food)
- Pierogi – similar dumplings from Poland often made with firmer dough
- Dumpling
