= Black dumplings =

Silesian noodle dish

Kluski czarne
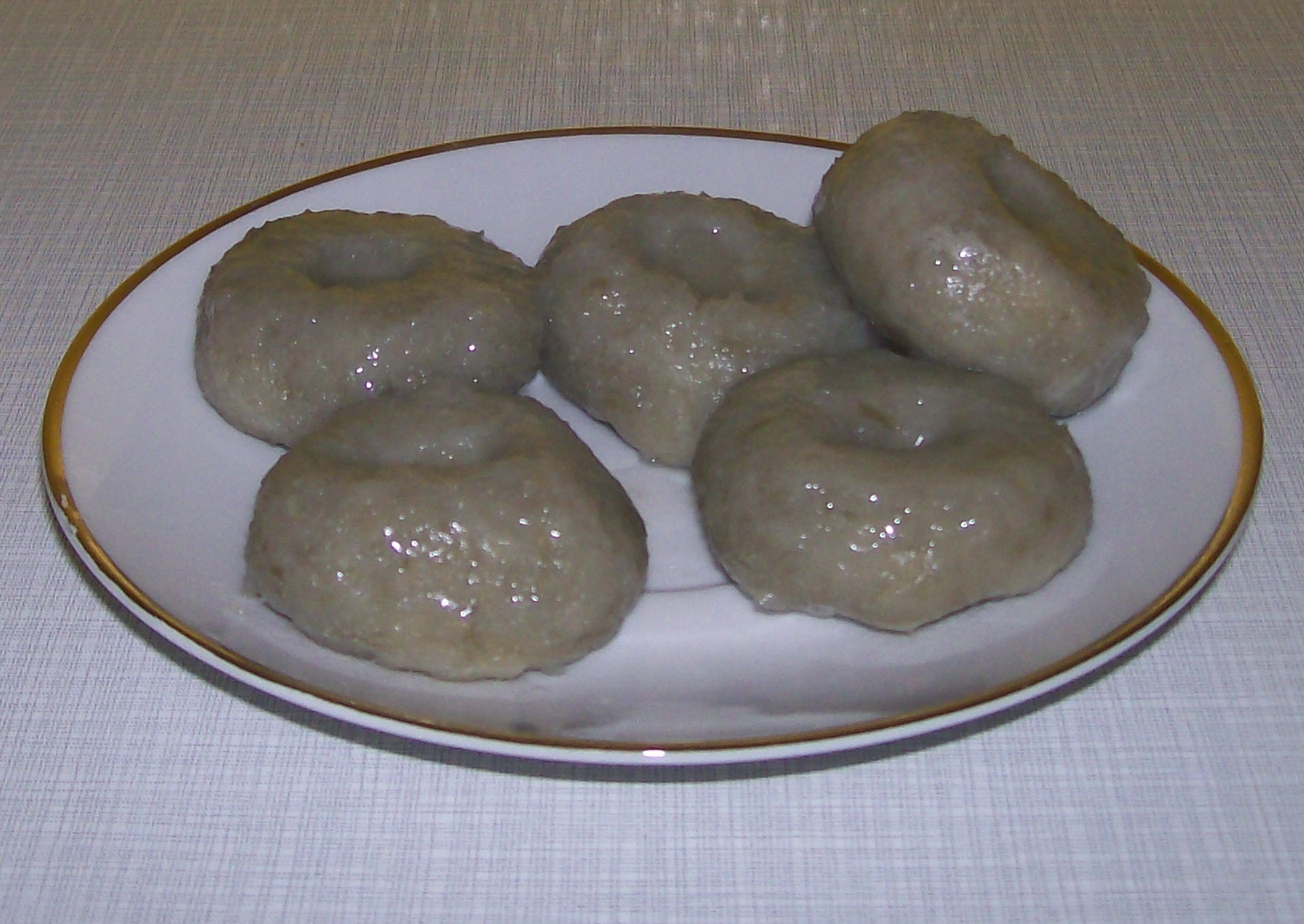
- Black dumplings, kluski żelazne
- Type: Dumpling
- Region or state: Silesia
- Main ingredients: Potatoes, flour, potato starch

Kluski czarne (black dumplings; Silesian: czorne kluski), also known as kluski polskie (Polish dumplings; polske knedle) or kluski żelazne (iron dumplings; żelazne knedle), are a variety of dumplings popular in Silesia. In addition to minced potatoes and flour, the dough contains also potato starch, which adds to its colour.

They differ from the Silesian white dumplings in that they are usually not made with mashed cooked potatoes, but with grated raw potatoes. Both black and white dumplings are served at weddings and other traditional feasts in Silesia. According to tradition, they should be served in odd numbers.
