= Butsyky (food) =

Traditional Ukrainian dish

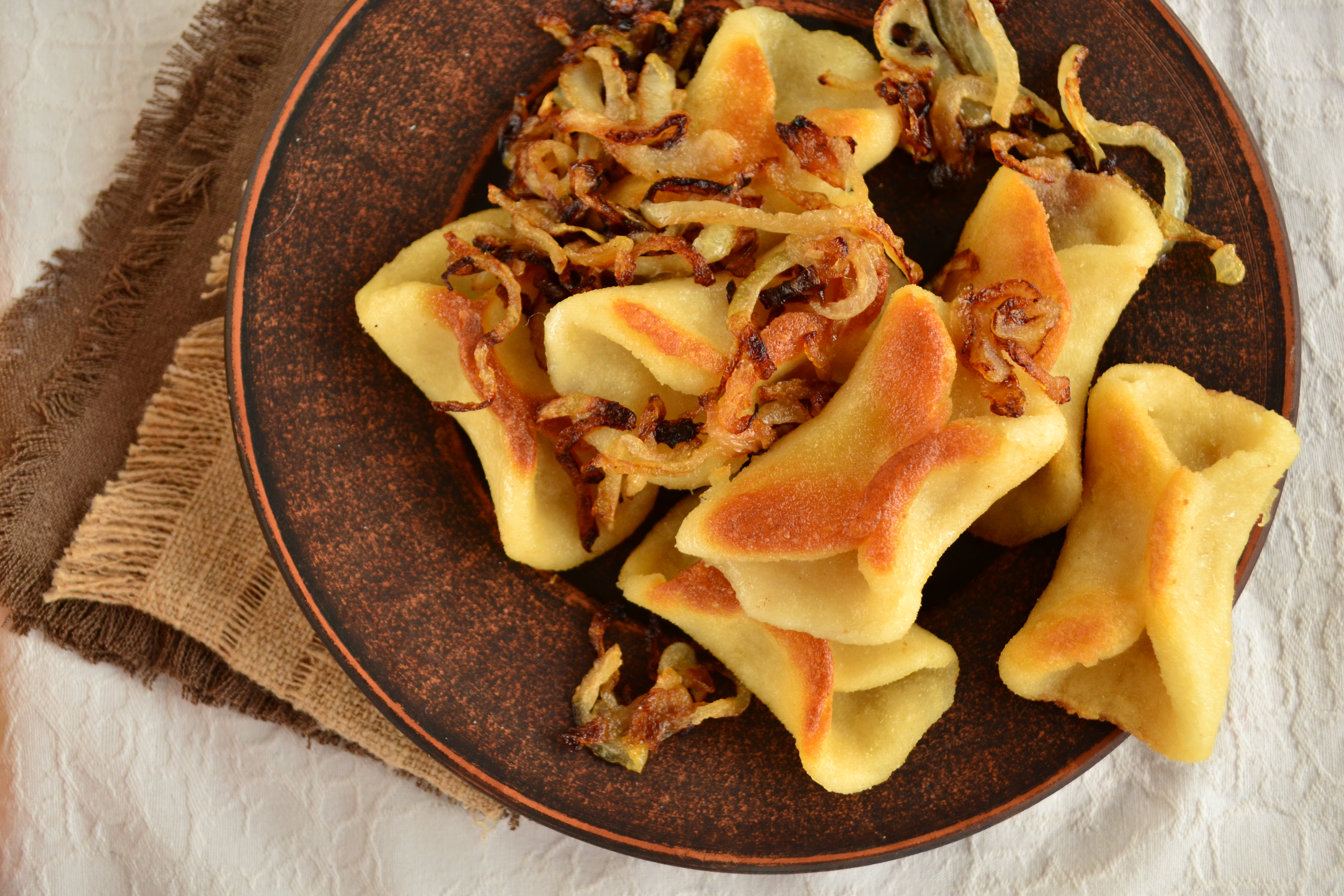
- Type: dumpling, pasta
- Course: main course
- Place of origin: Ukraine
- Serving temperature: hot
- Main ingredients: flour, milk, egg, baking soda, oil

Butsyky (Ukrainian: буцики) is a Ukrainian dish, similar to dumplings, kluski, or varenyky without filling. Traditionally savory and served with cracklings, sweet versions are also available. The dough is rolled out, shaped, boiled, fried in butter, and typically finished with a topping.

It is an old Ukrainian dish, similar to dumplings, kluski, or varenyky without filling..
