= Amaretti di Saronno =

Italian biscuit

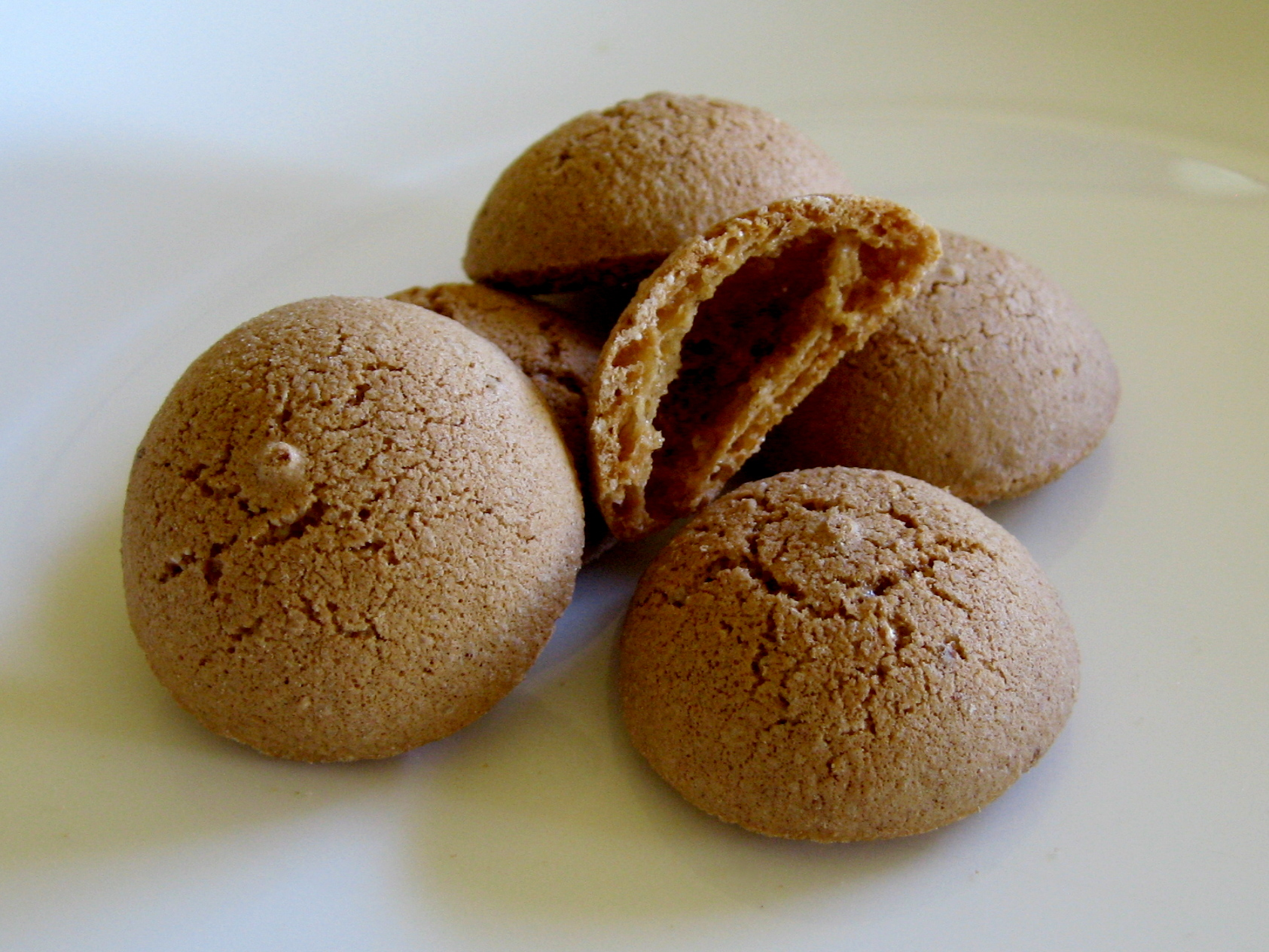
- Type: Macaroon
- Place of origin: Italy
- Region or state: Saronno, Lombardy
- Associated cuisine: Italian (Lombard)
- Main ingredients: Apricot kernels, sugar, egg whites

Amaretti di Saronno (Italian: [amaˈretti di saˈrɔnno]) are a type of amaretto, a bitter-sweet flavored macaroon, traditional to the Italian city of Saronno. It is one of many types of traditional amaretti, but the only one made with apricot kernels (the others are usually made with almonds).

Amaretti di Saronno are widely available commercially, most notably through the brand Lazzaroni.

== Legend ==
A legend claims that in the early 18th century, a Milanese bishop or cardinal surprised the city of Saronno with a visit. A young couple, residents of the town, welcomed him and paid tribute with an original confection: on the spur of the moment, they had baked biscuits made with sugar, egg whites, and crushed apricot kernels. These so pleased the visiting bishop that he blessed the two with a happy and lifelong marriage, resulting in the preservation of the secret recipe over many generations.

== See also ==
- List of Italian desserts and pastries
- List of almond dishes
