= Knysza =

Type of fast food

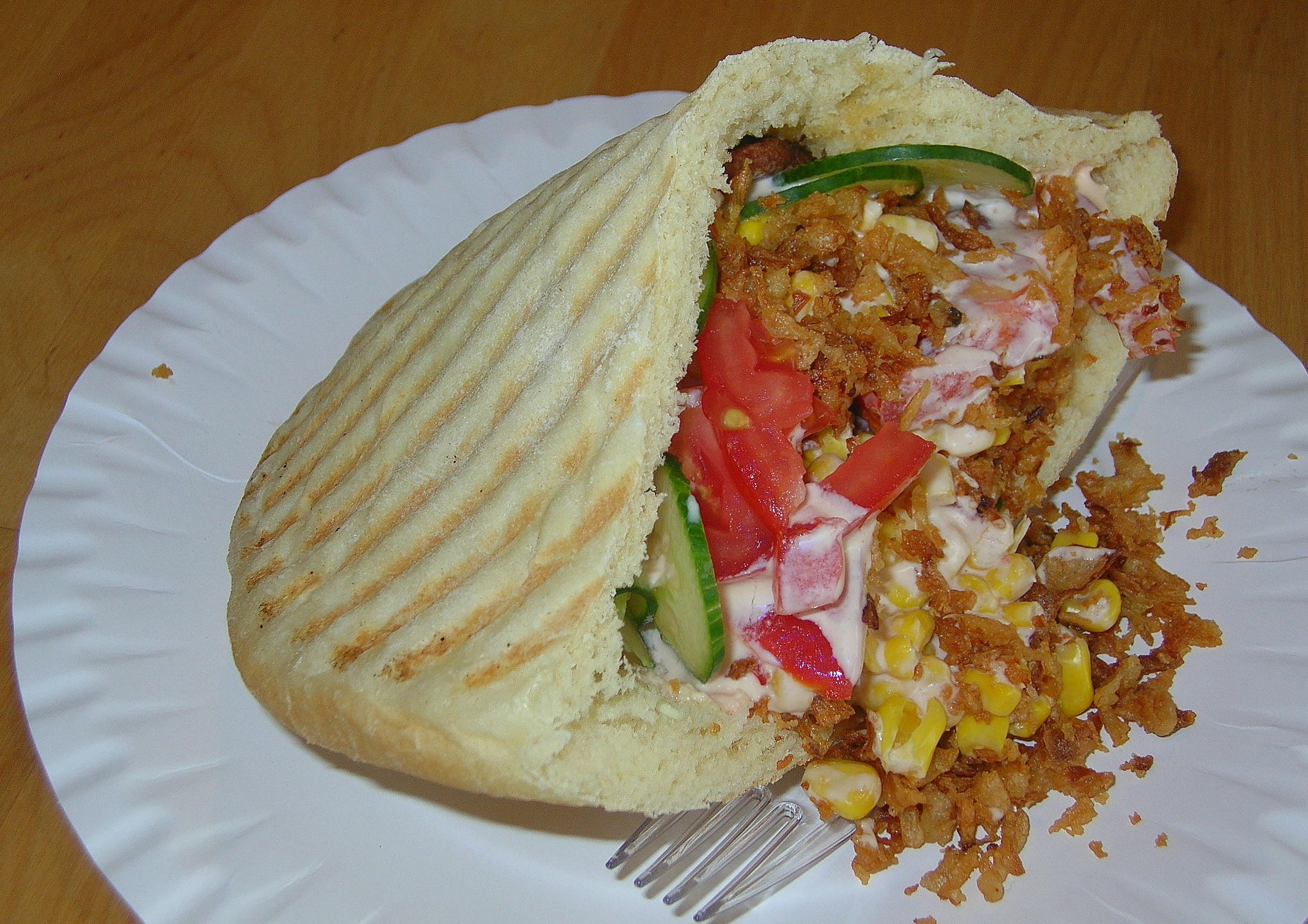
- Knysza with vegetables, roasted onion, cutlet and sauce.
- Type: Fast food
- Course: Main, fast food
- Place of origin: Poland
- Serving temperature: Hot
- Main ingredients: Dough: yeast bread roll Filling: vegetables, cutlet, sauce

Knysza ([ˈknɨʂa]; Silesian: wiedza) is a type of fast food, consisting of a bread roll amply filled with a variety of ingredients. The bread is a sliced-in-half yeast bread roll (bułka drożdżowa), sometimes grilled prior, abundantly infilled with a variety of ingredients, including vegetables, cutlet, topped profusely with sauce.

The original knysza is vegetarian and is named "knysza with vegetables" (knysza z warzywami), with the bread roll solely infilled with fresh vegetables (white and red cabbage, tomato, cucumber and canned sweetcorn), generously topped with garlic sauce, mayonnaise or spicy sauce, besprinkled with roasted onion. Variants of knysza include those with meat, for example cutlet (kotlet), chicken or sausage, as well as a version with cheese.

Knysza is most popular in Wrocław, where the meal rose in popularity in the 1990s.

== See also ==
- Doner kebab
- Knish
