= Silesian dumplings =

Traditional Silesian potato dumplings

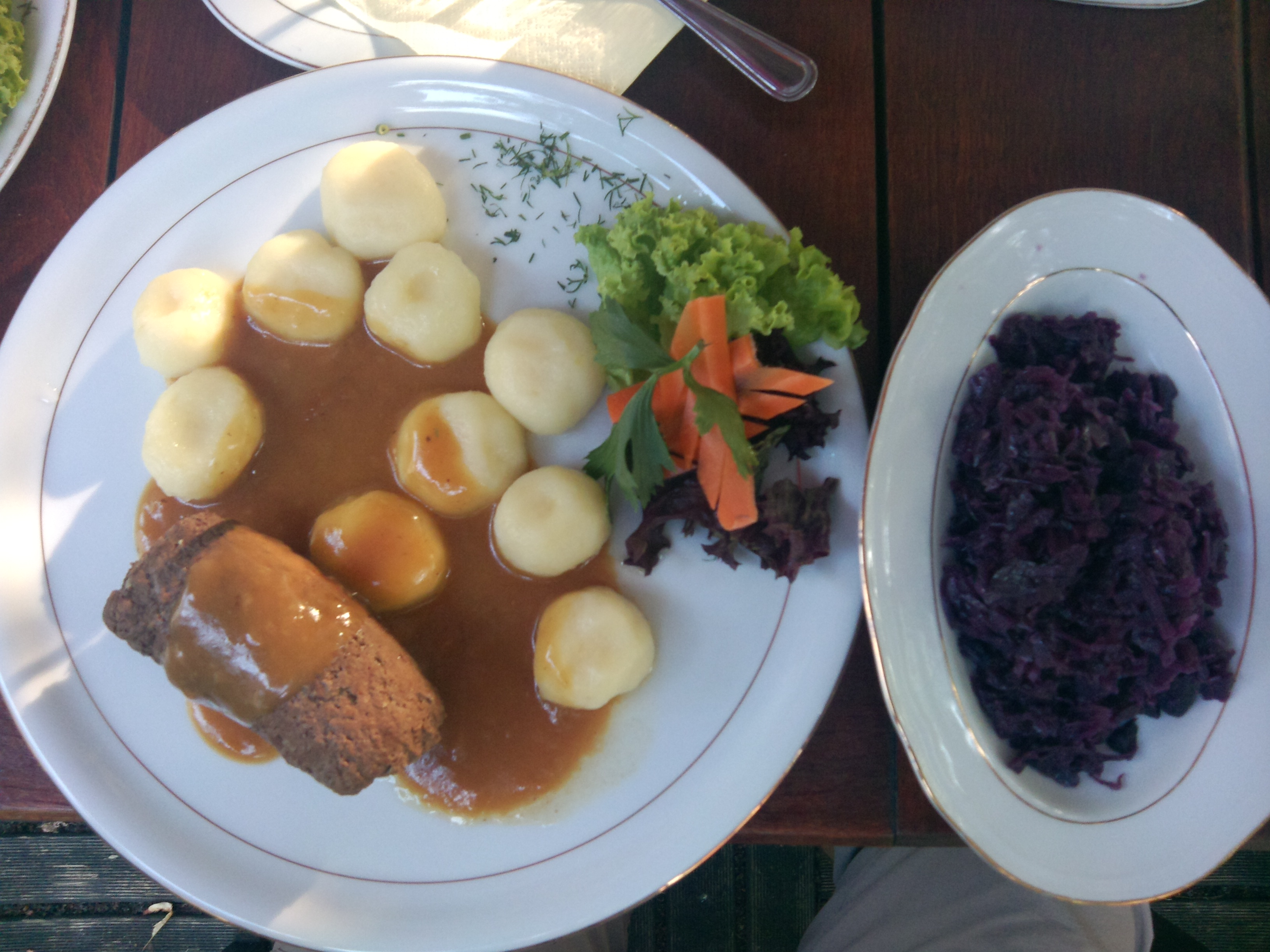
- Dumplings as part of a traditional Silesian lunch, also consisting of a rolada and a red cabbage salad
- Alternative names: Gůmiklyjzy
- Type: Dumpling
- Region or state: Silesia
- Main ingredients: mashed boiled potatoes, potato flour

Silesian dumplings (Silesian: Gůmiklyjzy Silesian German: Gummikließla Polish: kluski śląskie,) are potato dumplings traditional to the Silesia region of Central Europe, falling under the list of Silesian dishes. In Polish, they are sometimes called białe kluski ("white dumplings").

The dumplings are listed by the Polish Ministry of Agriculture and Rural Development as known regional or traditional foodstuff, with the Ministry chronicling versions from both the Silesian Voivodeship and the Opole Voivodeship.

== Preparation ==
The dough for white dumplings is made of first boiled and then mashed potatoes (moderately cooled, but still warm), potato flour and a little bit of salt. The ratio of potatoes and flour is about 3:1 or 4:1. In some recipes, a whole egg may be added to the dough (this helps shaping if the mashed potatoes cooled too much and the shaping becomes problematic).

There are two methods of forming the dumplings. The first one is by slicing them up with a knife from the dough rolls. The other way is to just hand roll them from the dough and flatten. Finally, a depression for gravy is made with a thumb. The dumplings are then boiled in salted water until they float to the surface.

== Service ==
The dish consisting of the dumplings, fried beef rouladen with rich gravy, and boiled red cabbage is an invariable component of the dinner served on Sundays or feast days in many traditional Silesian families. This dinner is frequently considered a canonical part of Silesian culture, and often tied to coal mining culture as well. Left-over dumplings can be reheated or fried (like potatoes) for supper and eaten with left-over gravy or butter.

== Black Silesian dumplings ==
A similar dish, dark-coloured dumplings are also sometimes served in Silesia. They are typically known by other names, including inne kluski śląskie ("the other Silesian dumplings"), czorne kluski ("black dumplings"), or kluski polskie ("Polish dumplings").

== See also ==
- Silesian cuisine
- Raspeball
- Black noodles
- Kopytka
