= Kopalnioki =

Candy from Silesia, Poland

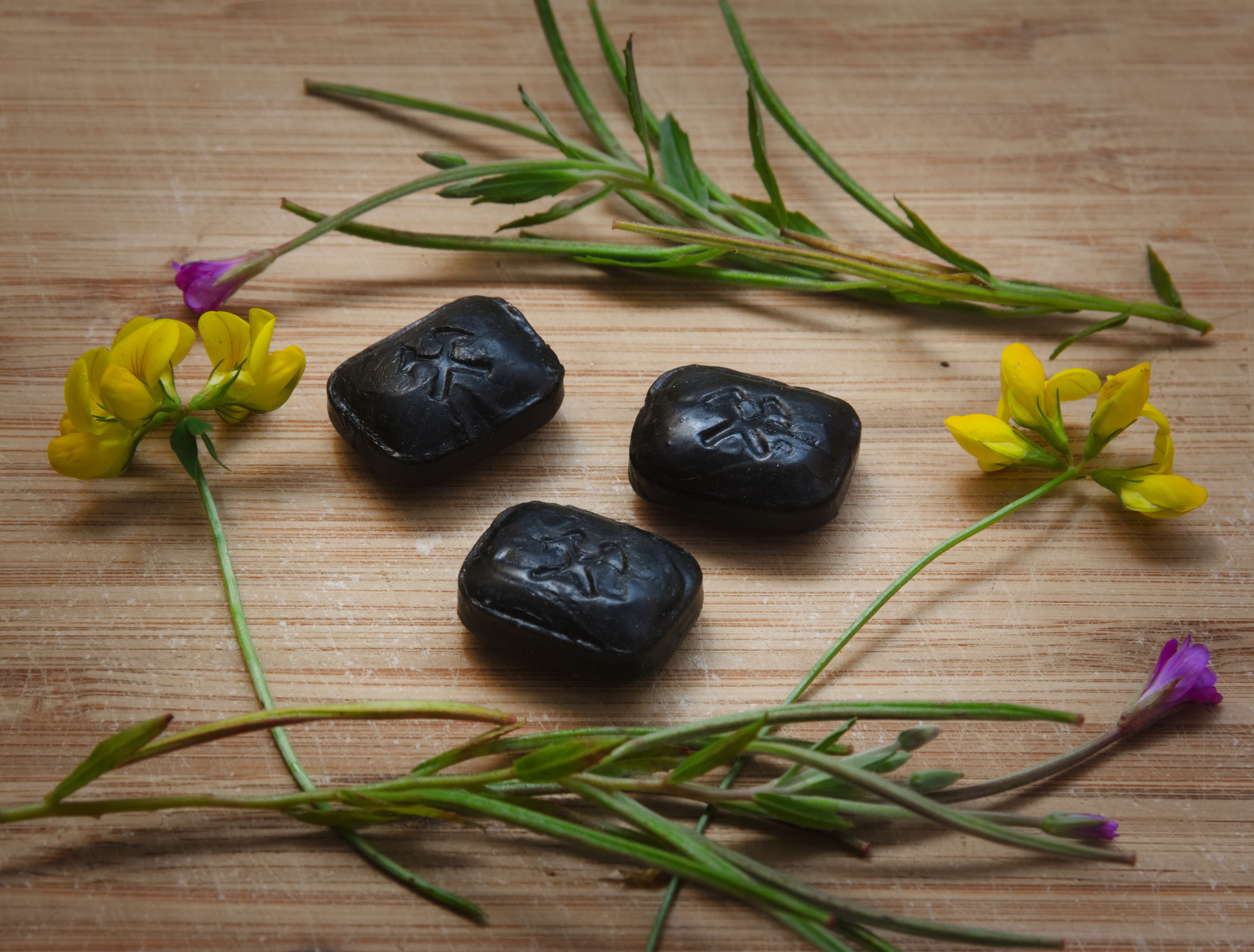
- Kopalnioki
- Alternative names: Kopalnik (sing.)
- Type: Candy
- Course: Dessert
- Place of origin: Silesia, Poland
- Serving temperature: Cold
- Main ingredients: Anise, melissa

Kopalnioki (German: Kräuterbonbons, literally "herbs candy") is a hard Silesian candy without filling, with a mint-anise taste, common since the end of the nineteenth-century.

== Ingredients ==
The candy are produced from sugar, anise oil, hypericum extract, melissa and mint as well as colouring - carbo medicinalis.

== Etymology ==
The name of the candy, originally just called Kräuterbonbons ("herb candy" in German), evolved into Polish kopalnioki, which is derived from the Polish word for coal mines, kopalnie. It can be further explained by the dark colour and coal-like shape of the sweet. During the times of the Province of Silesia, the candy was given to coal miners to protect their throat from coal particles. Coal miners would often take a few pieces for their children which popularised the sweet and kept it common even when the region became Polish.

== See also ==
- List of Polish desserts
- List of Polish dishes
