= Bitterkoekje =

Type of cookie in the Netherlands

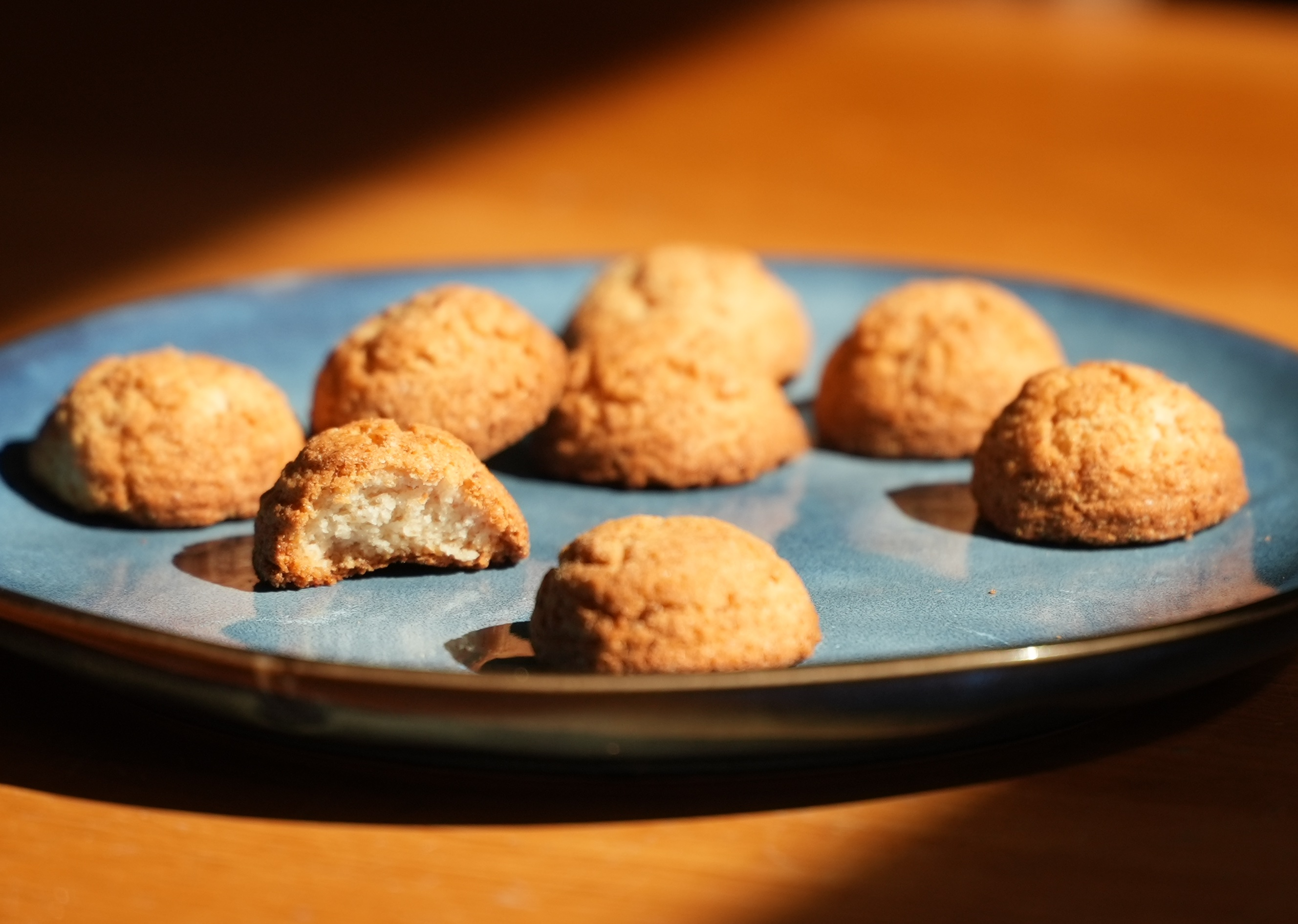
- Alternative names: trouwkoekje (obsolete)
- Type: cookie
- Place of origin: Netherlands
- Main ingredients: bitter almond, almonds, sugar, egg white
- Variations: with abricot kernels

A bitterkoekje is a traditional Dutch biscuit made from a mixture of ground bitter and sweet almonds, granulated sugar and egg white. Known for its chewy texture and characteristic almond aroma, it is often compared to the Italian hard almond cookies amaretti, ('amaro' means bitter), though preparation, texture and taste distinguish the two. The dough of bitterkoekjes is piped or shaped into small rounds and baked until the surface is lightly golden.

== History ==
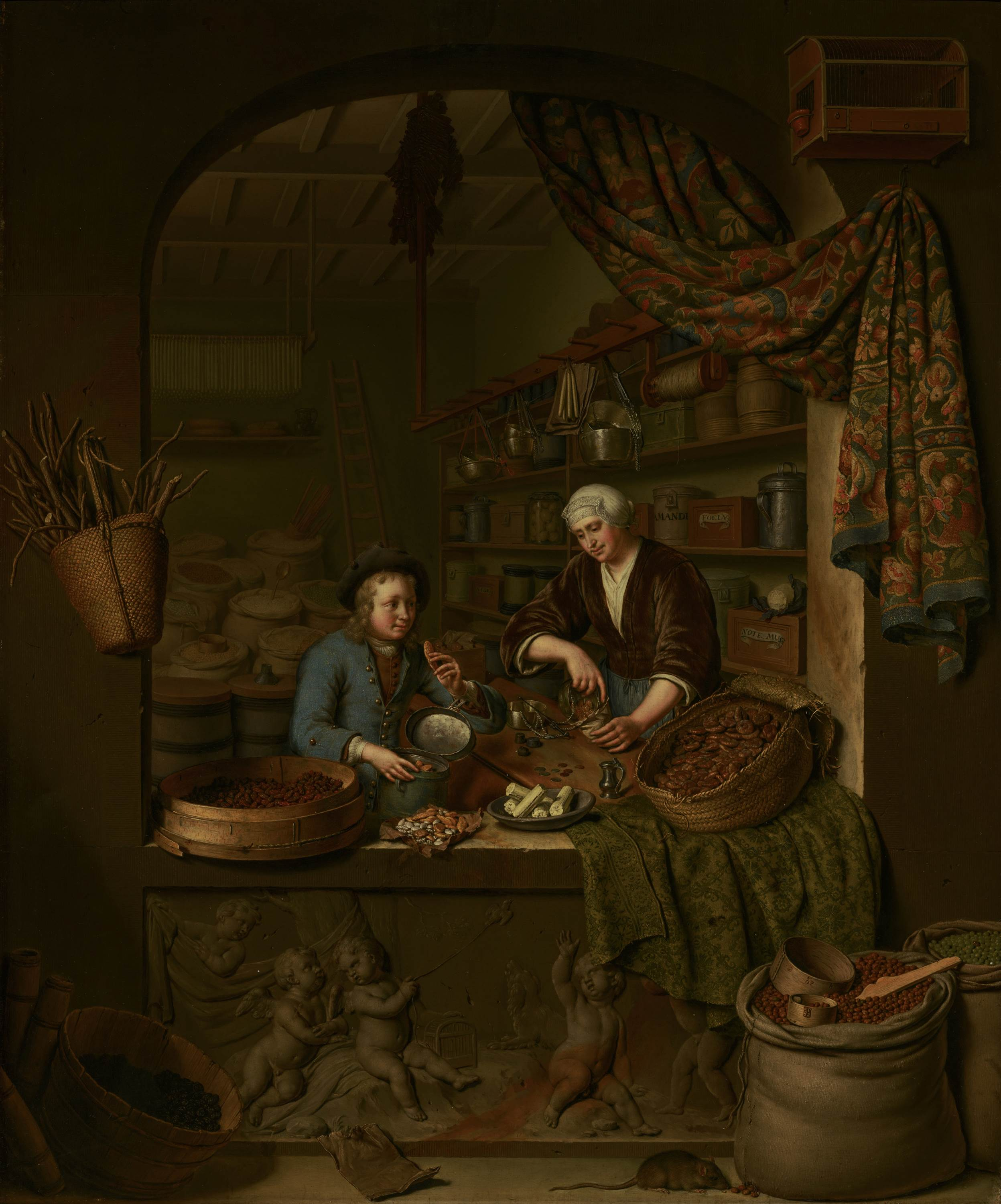
A Grocer's Shop (1717) by Willem van Mieris, to the left a boy with an almond cookie or a bitterkoekje in his hand.

The name bitterkoekje translates directly to "bitter cookie" in Dutch, referring to the use of bitter almonds in its recipe. While the flavor is not truly bitter, the inclusion of bitter almonds imparts a distinctive depth and aroma, balanced by sugar and the natural sweetness of sweet almonds.

The origins of the Bitterkoekje have not been precisely documented, but it has been a popular confection in the Netherlands since at least the 18th century. Bitterkoekjes were also known as trouwkoekjes (wedding cookies) and were served during engagements or weddings. The combination of sweet and bitter ingredients was seen as a metaphor for married life, encompassing both joy and hardship.

Bitterkoekjes found their way into other foods. A classic Dutch dessert is bitterkoekjesvla and bitterkoekjespudding, where the cookies are simmered in milk and baked into a custard, and bitterkoekjeslikeur is a liqueur used in cocktails.

With industrial production in the 20th century, packaged versions became widely available in Dutch supermarkets, which have the almonds replaced with flour of white beans and the kernels of apricot pits as cheap alternatives.
