= Kichel =

Cookie or cracker in Jewish cuisine

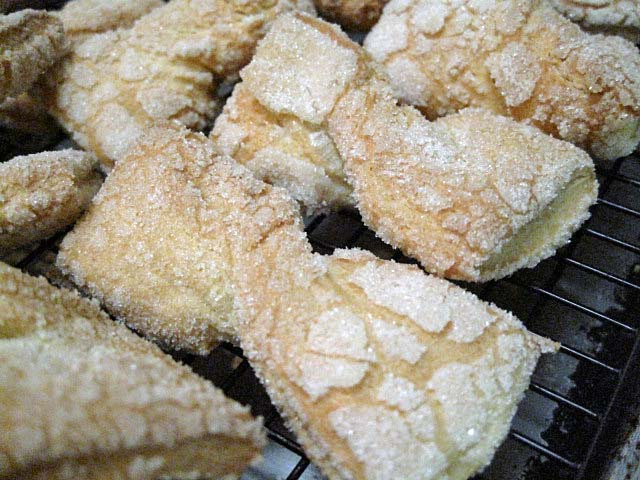
- Type: Cookie or cracker
- Place of origin: Eastern Europe
- Main ingredients: Eggs, sugar

Kichel (Yiddish: קיכל, plural kichlach קיכלעך, the diminutive of קוכן kukhn "cake") is a slightly sweet cracker or cookie in Jewish cuisine. Made from eggs, flour, and sugar, the dough is rolled out flat and cut into bow-tie shapes.

Commercially prepared kichel are dry, bow-tie shaped pastries sprinkled with sugar. They are traditionally served at the kiddush in synagogues after Shabbat services and are also a popular dessert at Rosh Hashanah.

Kichlach seem to have developed in central or eastern Europe in Ashkenazi Jewish communities by the nineteenth century and subsequently gained popularity around the world with the diaspora and migrations in the twentieth century. Kiddush in early twentieth-century Ashkenazi synagogues centered around kichlach, pickled herring, and schnapps. Jews in South Africa still serve kichel with chopped herring, also a common practice in American synagogues until the 1950s. Kichlach are sometimes eaten with another kind of savoury dip or topping.

Due to their light, airy texture, the cookies are sometimes called "nothings." Kichlach have a reputation for being a dry cookie and are often dipped in a hot beverage such as tea. When prepared with matzah meal rather than flour, kichlach can be consumed during the Passover holiday.
