= Macaroon =

Type of cookie

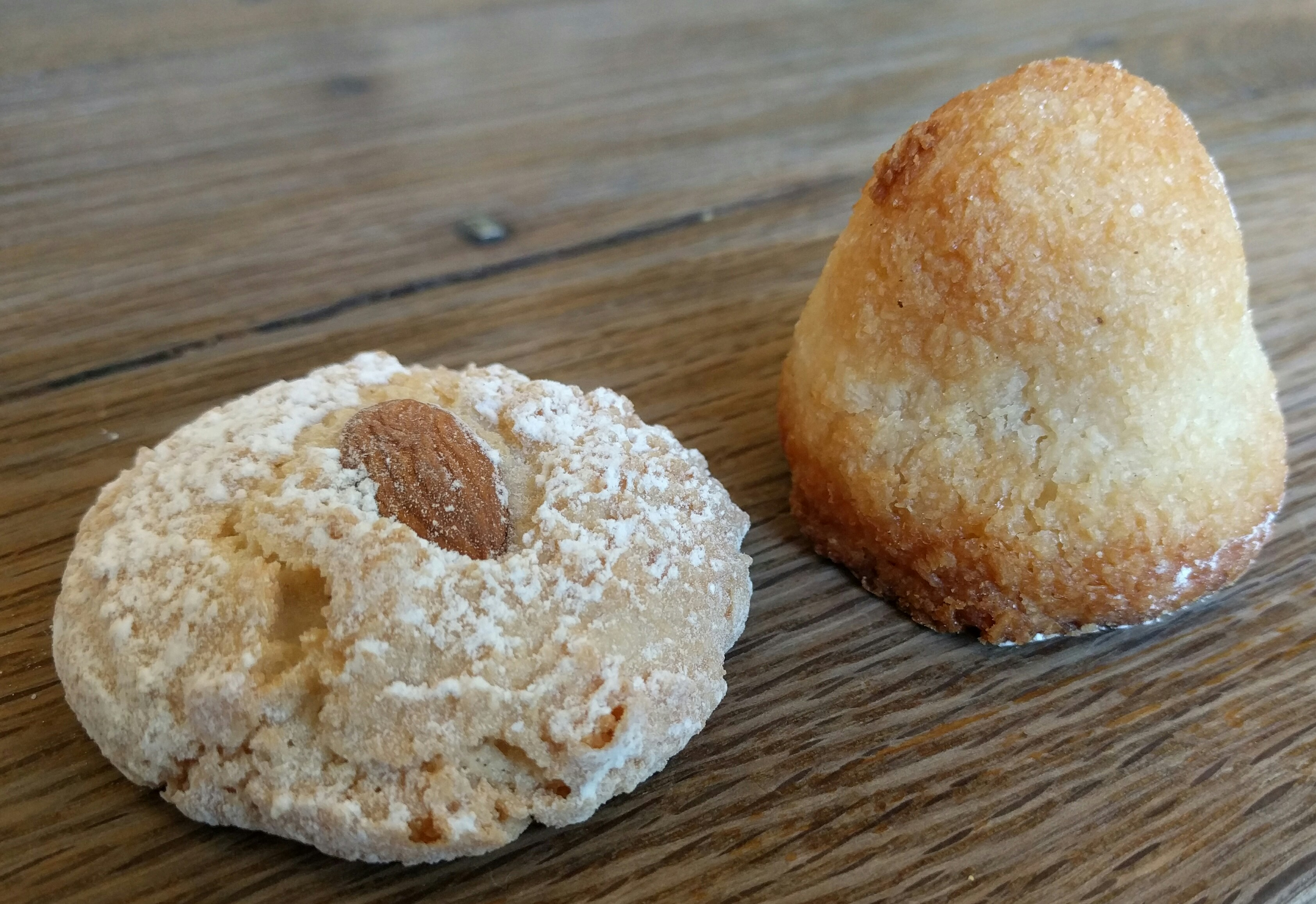
- Almond and coconut macaroons
- Type: Biscuit
- Course: Snack
- Place of origin: Middle East; Italy; France
- Region or state: Mediterranean basin
- Main ingredients: Almonds (or coconuts), egg whites
- Other information: Cream filling, different flavors other than those shown

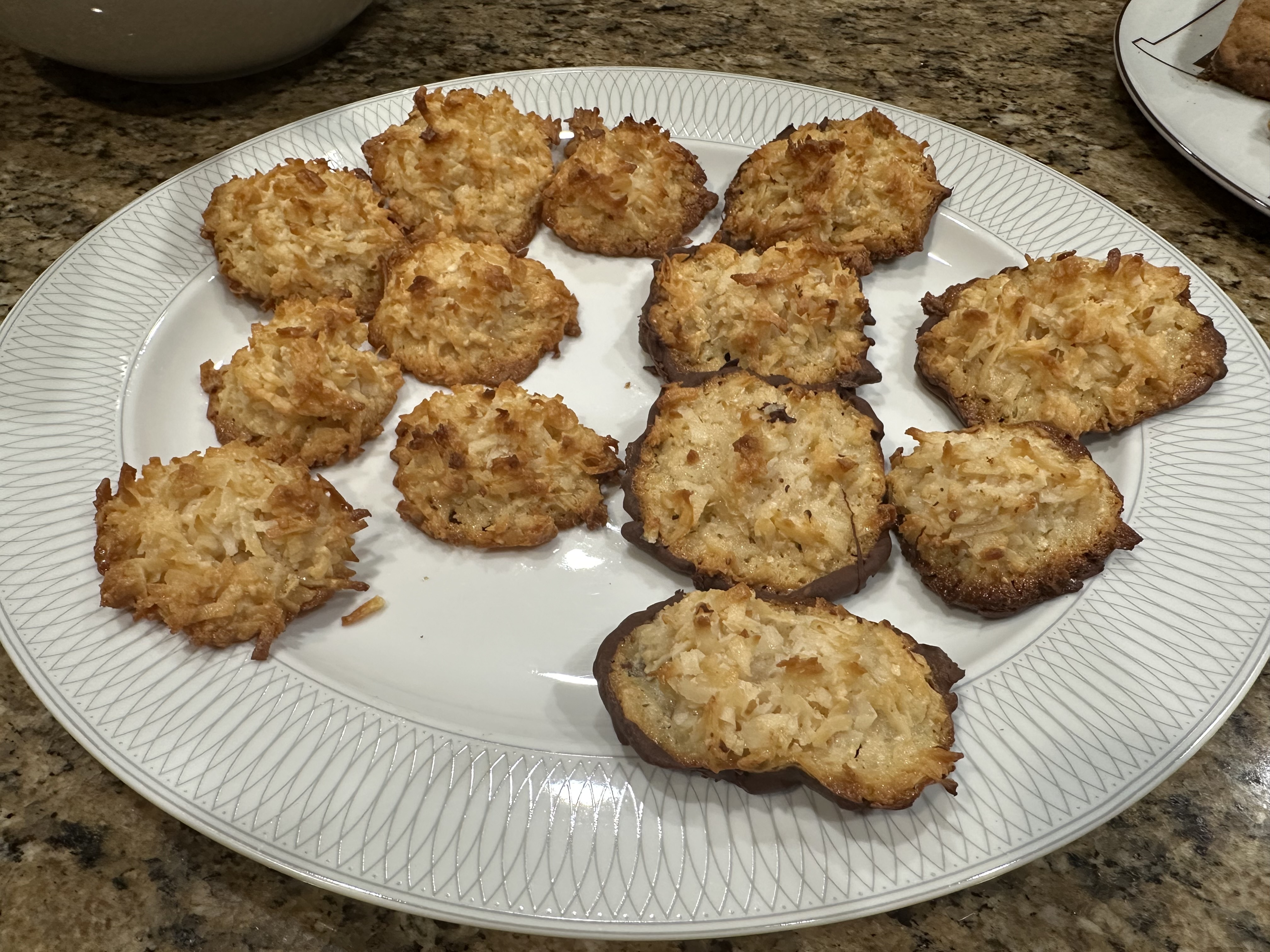
A plate of coconut and chocolate coconut macaroons served on Passover

A macaroon (/ˌmækəˈruːn/ MAK-ə-ROON) is a small cake or cookie, originally made from ground almonds, egg whites, and sugar, but now often with coconut or other nuts. They might also include jam, chocolate, or other flavorings.

== Etymology ==
The name macaroon is borrowed from French macaron, in turn from the Sicilian maccarone, a variant form of maccherone, the same word as macaroni. The origin of that is unclear; it may be from medieval Greek μακαρία, 'barley broth', or μακαρώνεια, 'funeral chant'. The etymology connecting it to Italian maccare, 'to bruise' is now rejected. The origin of the word may also have referred to a sort of pasta or macaroni.

== Origins ==
Macaroons can be traced to a French monastery of the 8th century in the city of Cormery. They were also made in Italian monasteries about the same time. In 1624 an abbey was founded in the heart of Nancy (Benedictine from 1668) by a daughter of Catherine de' Medici and Henry II of France, where macaroons were made. After the dissolution of this monastery during the French Revolution two of the nuns, Sister Marguerite and Sister Marie-Elisabeth, began baking and selling macaroons to the public. They became known as the "Macaroon Sisters".

Macaroons became a popular treat for Jews on Passover because they had no flour or leavening, as macaroons are leavened by egg whites.

Recipes for macaroons appeared in recipe books at least as early as 1725 (Robert Smith's Court Cookery, or the Complete English Cook), and use egg whites and almond paste. Mrs Beeton's Book of Household Management (1861) includes a typical traditional recipe. Over time, coconut was added to the ground almonds and, in certain recipes, replaced them. Potato starch is sometimes included in the recipe to give the macaroons more body.

== Nutrition ==
Mass-produced commercial macaroons generally weigh about 0.5 ounces (14 g). They undergo minimal food processing and typically contain only coconut, sweetener, starch, egg whites, and optional flavoring. Each macaroon contains approximately 60–70 calories, including 3–4 g of saturated fat from the coconut, and 3–4 g of added sugar, depending on the particular flavor. They are ovo-vegetarian but not lacto-vegetarian or vegan, as they contain egg whites; they are also free of gluten, dairy, cholesterol, or sulfites.

== Preparation ==
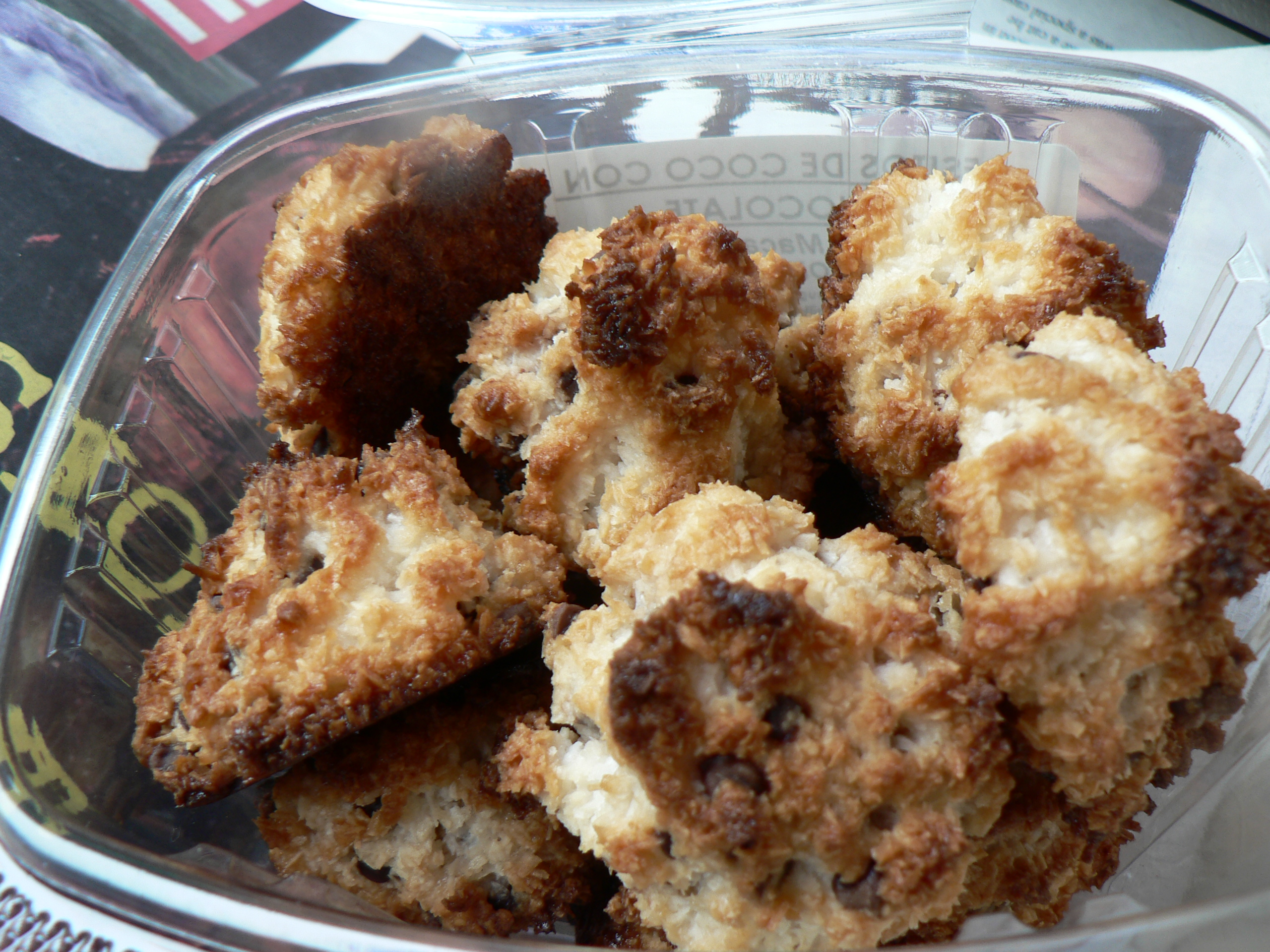
Coconut macaroons

Some recipes use sweetened condensed milk. Macaroons are sometimes baked on edible rice paper placed on a baking tray.

== Regional varieties ==
=== France ===
There are many regional variations of French macaroon. The coconut macaroon is known as the 'Congolais', or le rocher à la noix de coco.

=== Germany ===
Mandelhörnchen (almond crescents) are a common treat in Germany. Made of a flour similar to that of the macaroon, they are formed to resemble a crescent, then covered in sliced almonds and dipped in chocolate.

=== India ===
Thoothukudi in Tamil Nadu and Mangalore in Karnataka have their own varieties of macaroon made with cashews and egg whites, adapted from those introduced in colonial times.

=== Ireland ===
A macaroon chocolate bar is made by Wilton Candy in County Kildare, described as macaroon pieces in Irish milk chocolate. It was first made in 1937.

=== Italy ===
Italy has a wide tradition of cookies and confections made from ground almonds, including pignoli. Ricciarelli are a soft almond variety originating from Siena. Amaretti di Saronno are a crunchy variety from Saronno.

=== Netherlands ===
A Dutch macaroon is known as 'bitterkoekje'. Bitterkoekjes found their way into other foods. A classic Dutch dessert is bitterkoekjesvla and bitterkoekjespudding, where the cookies are simmered in milk and baked into a custard, and bitterkoekjeslikeur is a liqueur used in cocktails.

=== Philippines ===
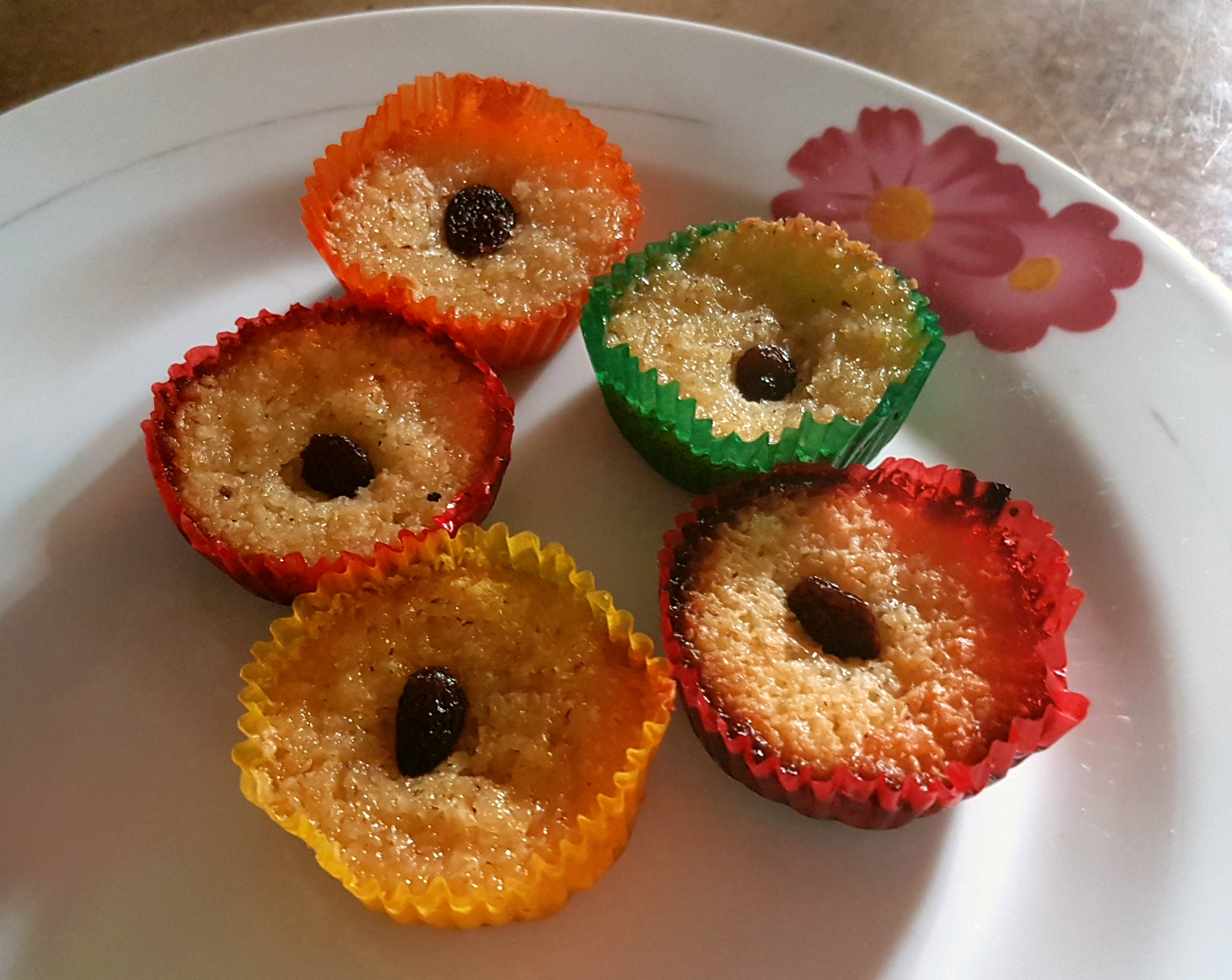
Philippine coconut macaroons

Philippine coconut macaroons are uniquely cake-like in texture. They are slightly crunchy on the outside and soft, moist, and chewy on the inside. They are usually baked into small, colourful cupcake wrappers and topped with a raisin. They are popular during holidays and special occasions.

=== Romania ===
The Romanian alcazare, or oftentimes referred to as alcazale, is a macaroon made with walnuts. It resembles the French macaron, as it is made by sandwiching a dense cacao cream in between two cookies. It is considered a staple desert for the holidays, at least since the communist period.

The etymology of the name is not clear, but it might originate from the Alcázar of Seville, as the alcazare bear some resemblance in colour to the columns of the Spanish royal palace.

=== Spain ===
The carajito (little love or darling) is a macaroon variant made with hazelnuts and honey from the town of Salas, Asturias in northern Spain.

=== Scotland ===
The Scottish macaroon has a dense, sugary centre and is covered in chocolate and roasted coconut. Traditionally, it was made with mashed potatoes and icing sugar. Modern commercial versions may eliminate the mashed potato.

Macaroon bars were created in 1931 by Lees of Scotland. They are made from a combination (depending on the producer) of sugar, glucose, water, and egg white. These ingredients make a fondant centre. This recipe was reportedly discovered by accident in Coatbridge in when confectioner John Justice Lees was said to have botched the formula for making a chocolate fondant bar and threw coconut over it in disgust, producing the first macaroon bar.

=== Libya ===
Libyan macarons called abambaer are made with almonds, sugar and egg whites. They are usually served in weddings and other special occasions alongside ruzata.

=== United States ===
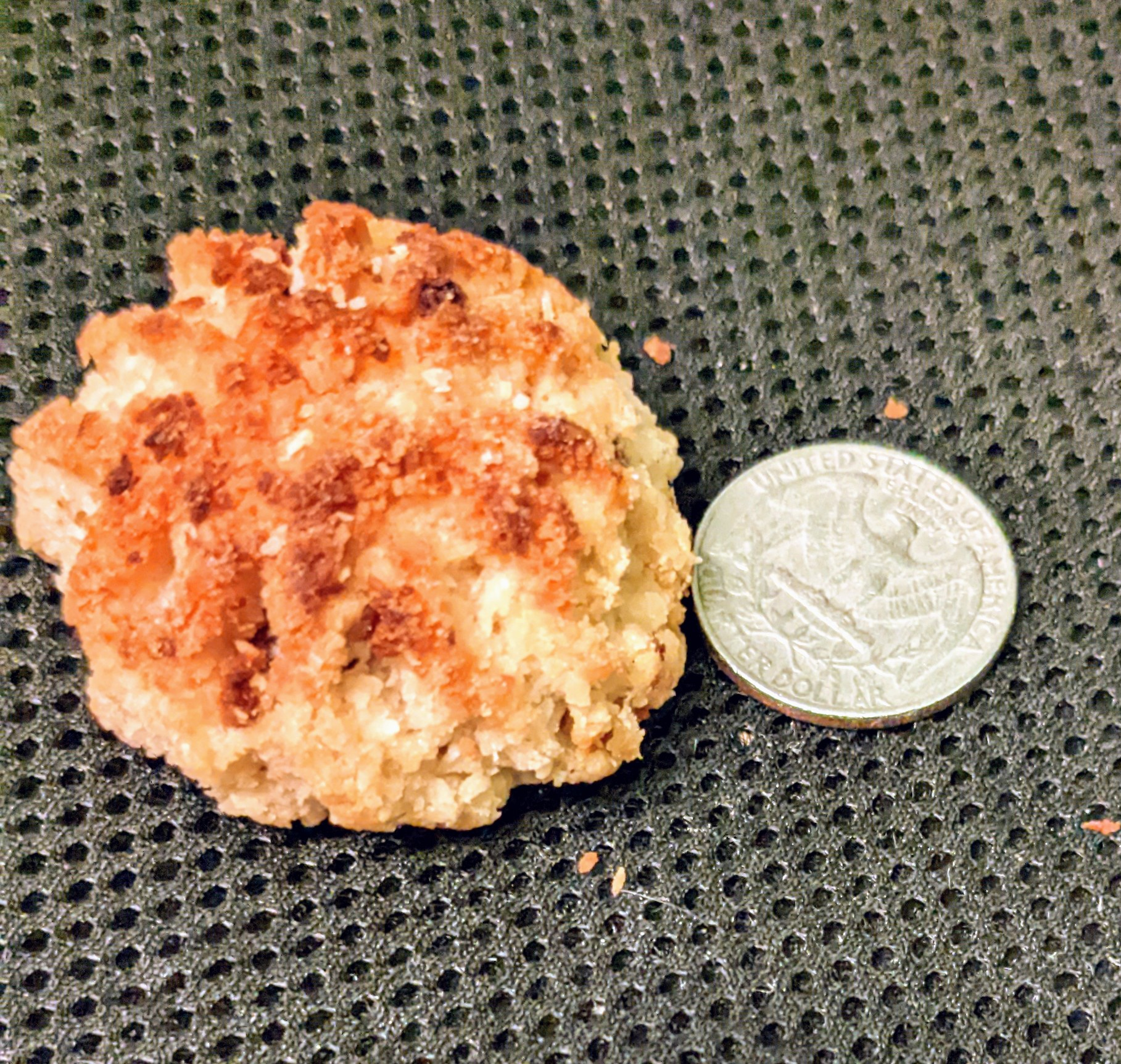
US commercially made coconut macaroon, with US quarter (⌀ 24.257 mm) for size reference

Macaroons come in a variety of flavors, including coconut, chocolate, chocolate chip, vanilla, and almond.

Commercially-made macaroons are generally dense, moist, and sweet. They are available in a few flavors and are often dipped in chocolate. Homemade macaroons and varieties produced by smaller bakeries are commonly light and fluffy. Macaroons made with coconuts are often piped with a star-shaped tip, whereas macaroons made with nuts are more likely to be shaped individually due to the stiffness of the dough.

== See also ==
- List of almond dishes
- Almond biscuit – similar to macaroons
- Cocadas – confectionery similar to small coconut macaroons
