= Dried apricot =

Dehydrated fruit Prunus sect. Armeniaca

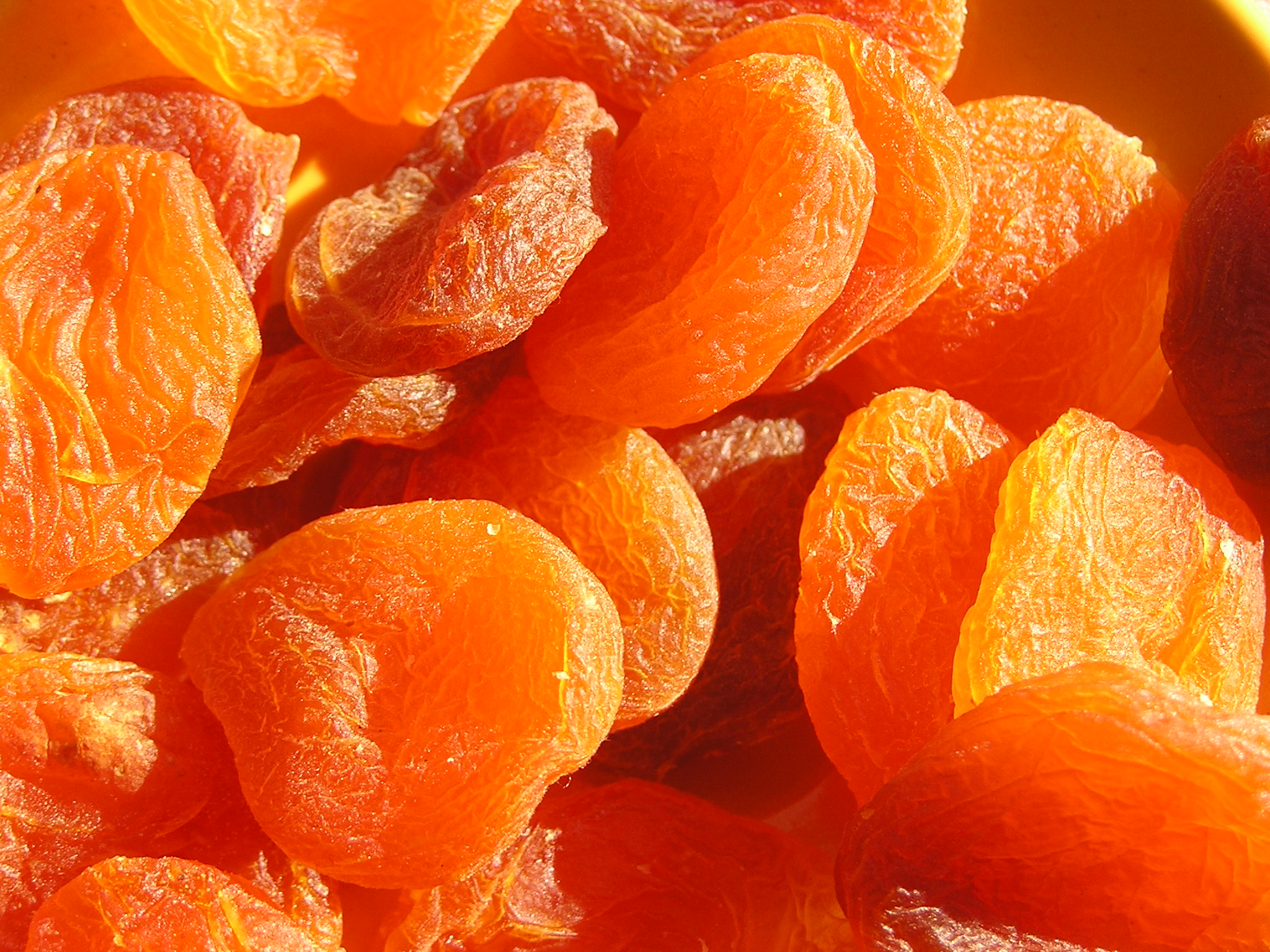
Dried apricots treated with sulfur dioxide contain between 2500 and 3000 ppm SO_{2} and range from light yellow to orange in color.

Dried apricots are dried fruit of the apricot tree.

Apricots have been cultivated in Central Asia since antiquity, and dried ones were an important commodity on the Silk Road. They could be transported over huge distances due to their long shelf life. Before the 20th century, they were ubiquitous in the Ottoman, Persian, and Russian Empires.

In more recent times, California was the largest producer, before being overtaken by Turkey, where about 95% of the dried apricot production is provided by the Malatya Province.

Small apricots are normally dried whole. Larger varieties are dried in halves, without the kernel or stone. Mediterranean or Turkish varieties of dried apricots are typically dried whole and then pitted, whereas California varieties are halved and pitted before drying.

In the countries of the former Soviet Union, the small ones, dried whole, are known as uryuk (урюк); whereas the larger ones, dried cut in halves, are known as kuraga (курага). Apricots dried whole, with the pit removed through the pedicel cavity, are called kaysa/qaysa (кайса). "Kaysa" is from Turkish kayısı, apricot (which in turn comes from Arabic),

When treated with sulfur dioxide, the color is a vivid orange. Organic fruits not treated with sulfur vapor are darker in color and have a coarser texture. Generally, the lighter the color, the higher the SO_{2} content.

When the water content of apricots is decreased by drying, the mass fraction of micronutrient content changes. The amounts are increased in the dried form, such as for vitamin A, vitamin E, copper, and potassium each having higher contents than in the raw fruit. See the nutritional comparison at apricot.

== Gallery ==
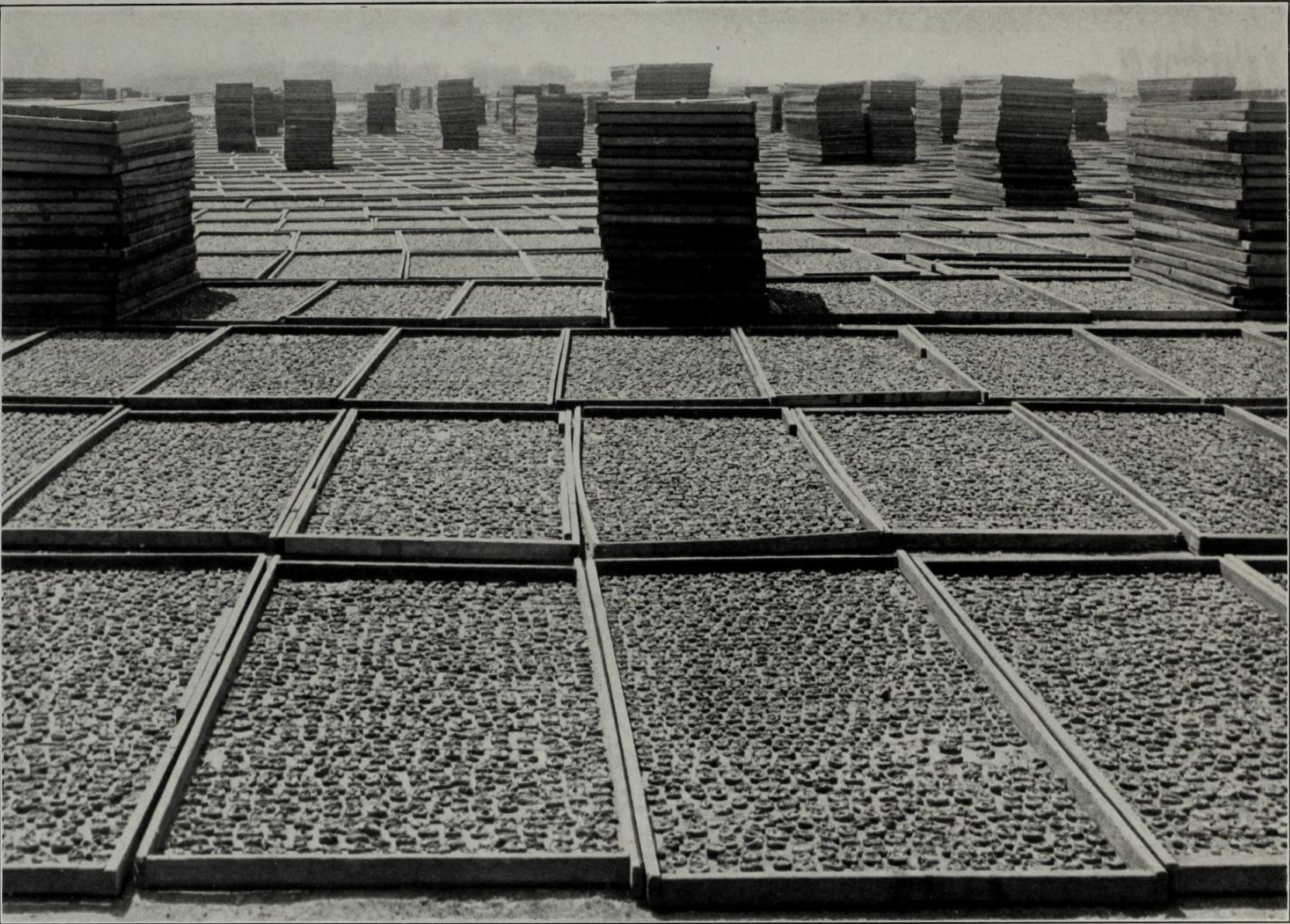
Apricots drying in California, early 20th century

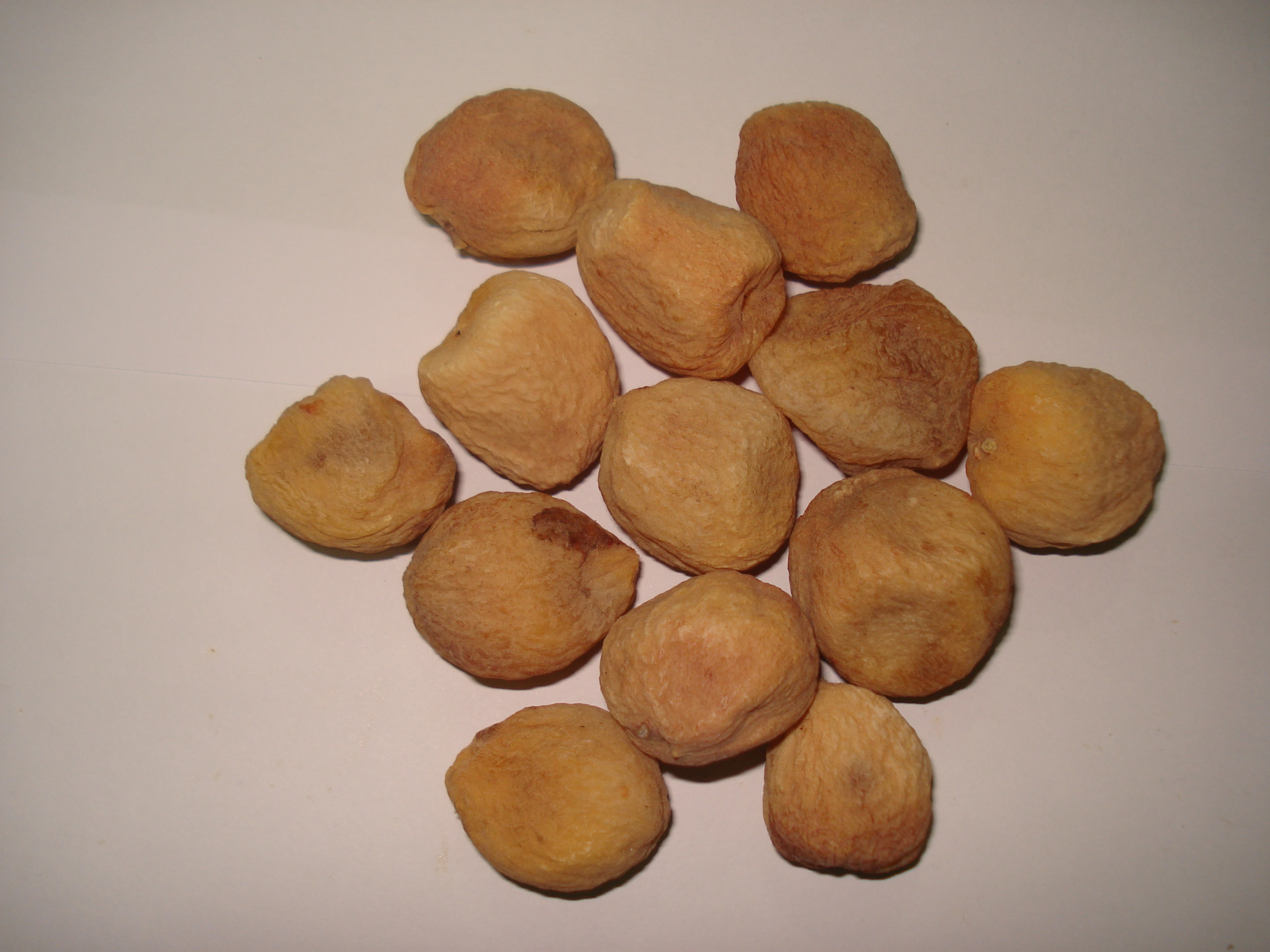
Uryuk

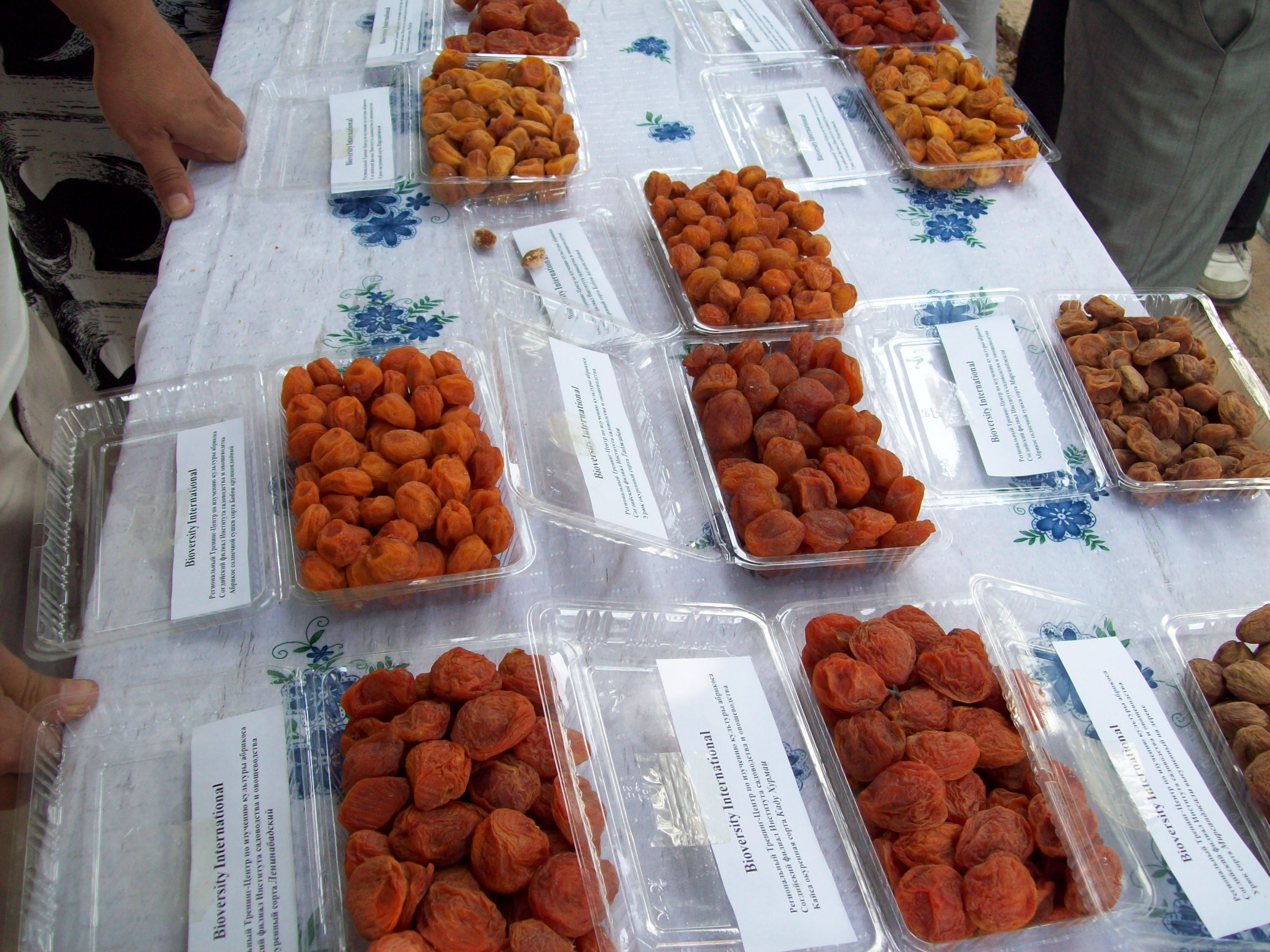
Uryuk and kaysa of several varieties, Uzbekistan (Note: Some are labeled as "sun-dried" and some as "[sulphur]-smoked" (окуренные))

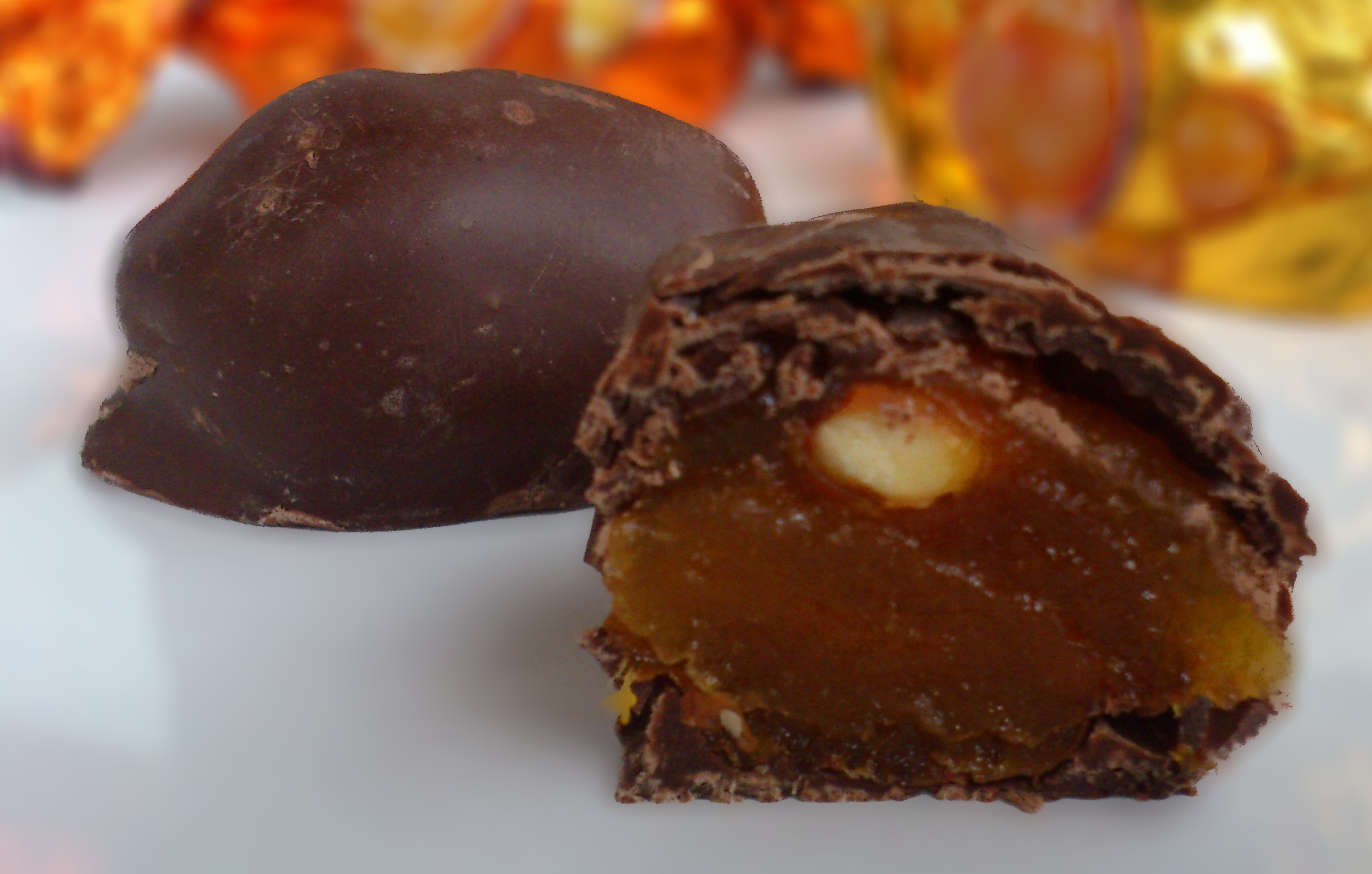
Chocolate-coated kuraga with almonds, popular in Russia and Kazakhstan

== See also ==
- List of dried foods
