= Fast food =

Mass-produced food designed for rapid service and consumption

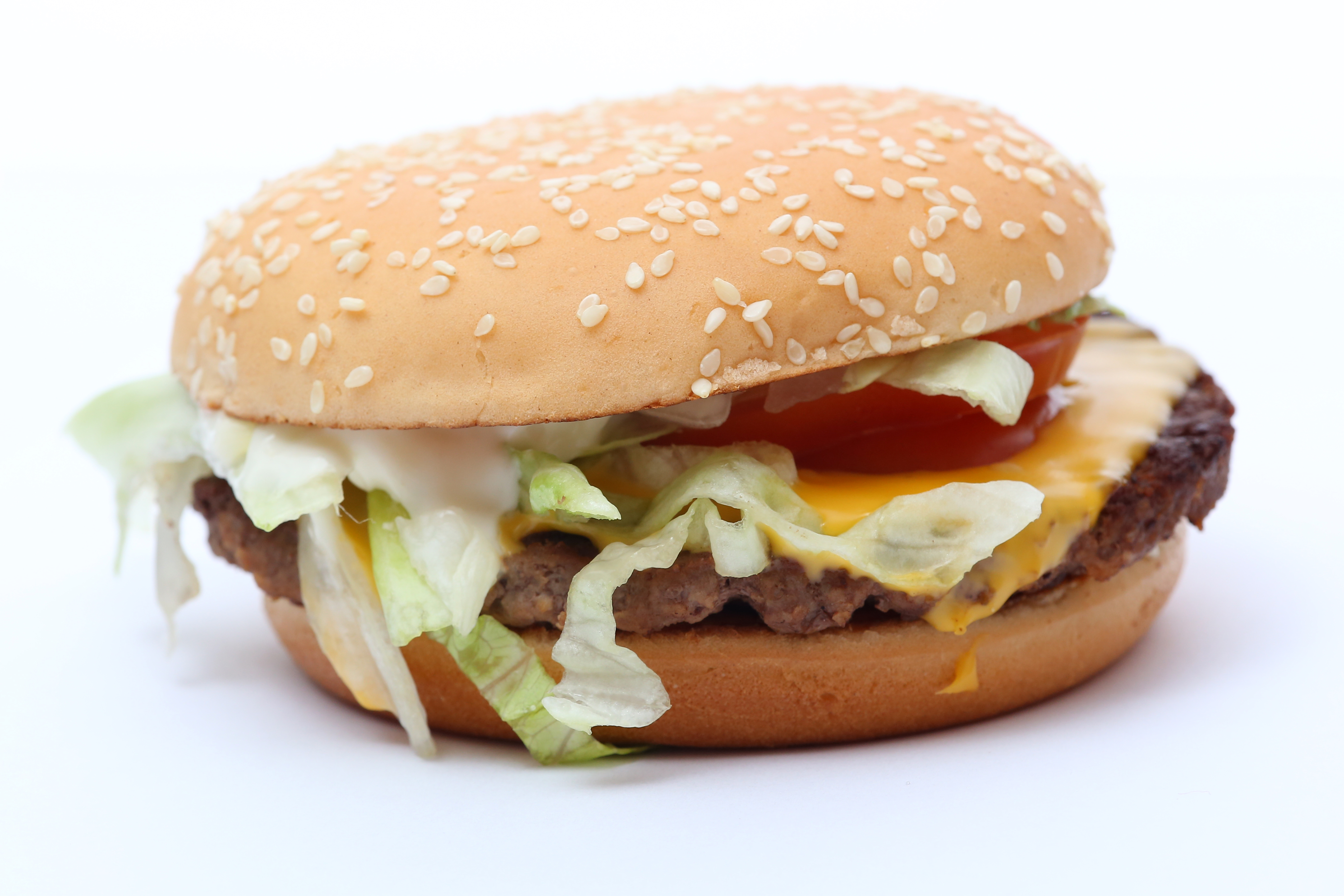
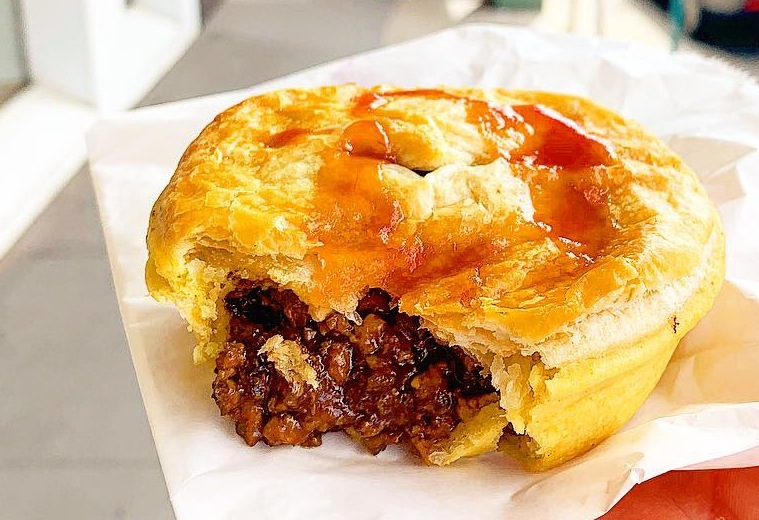
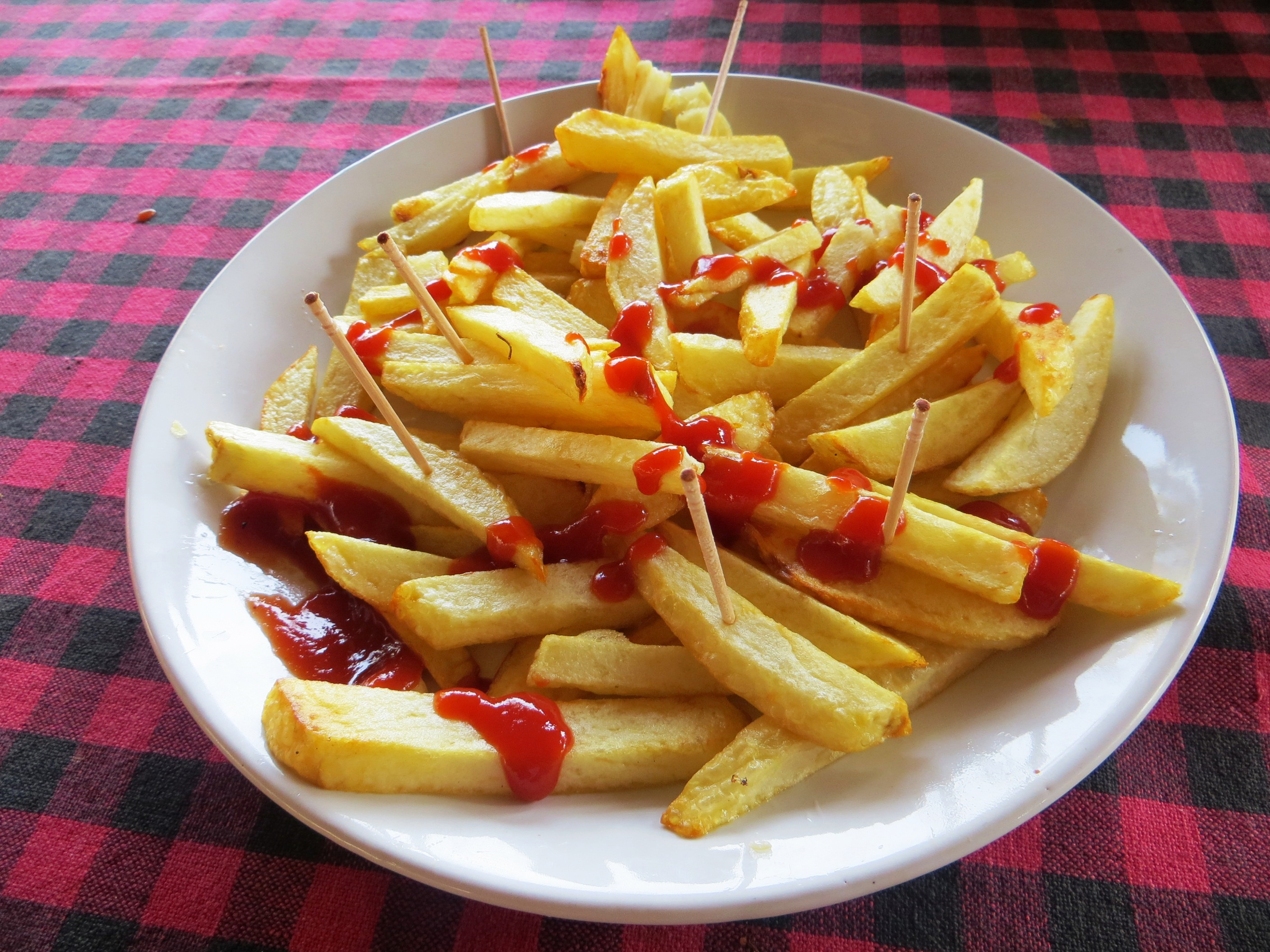
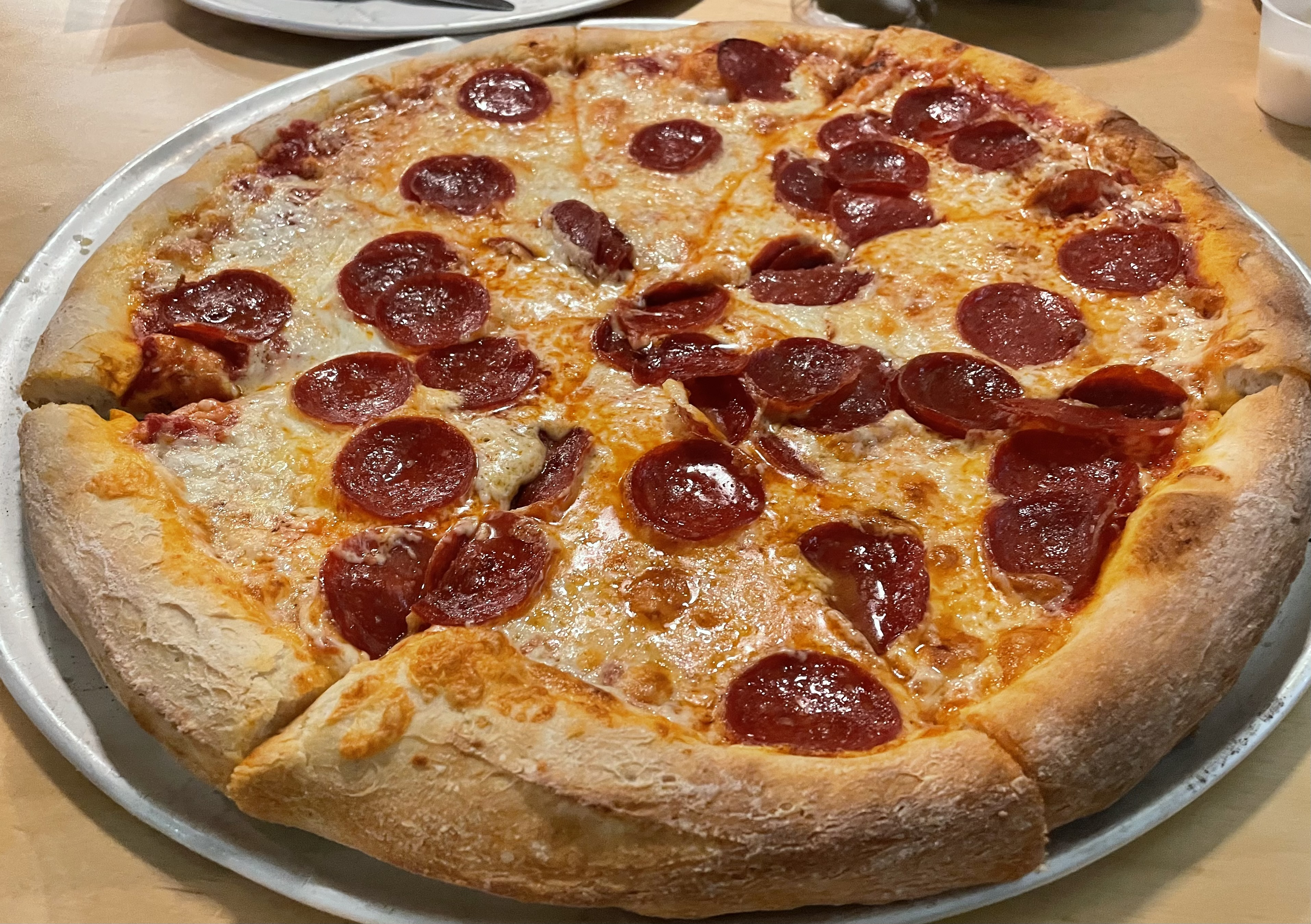
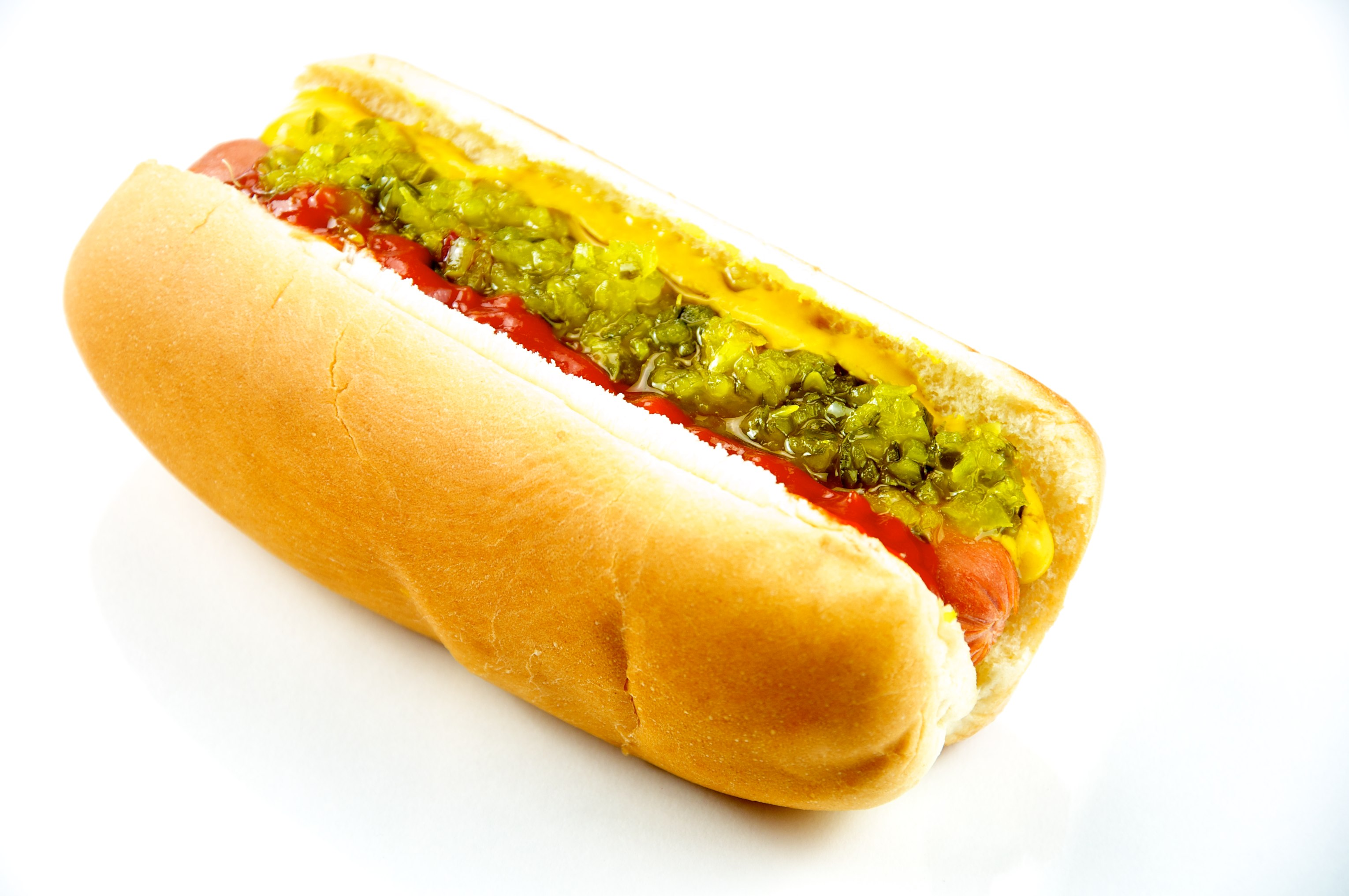
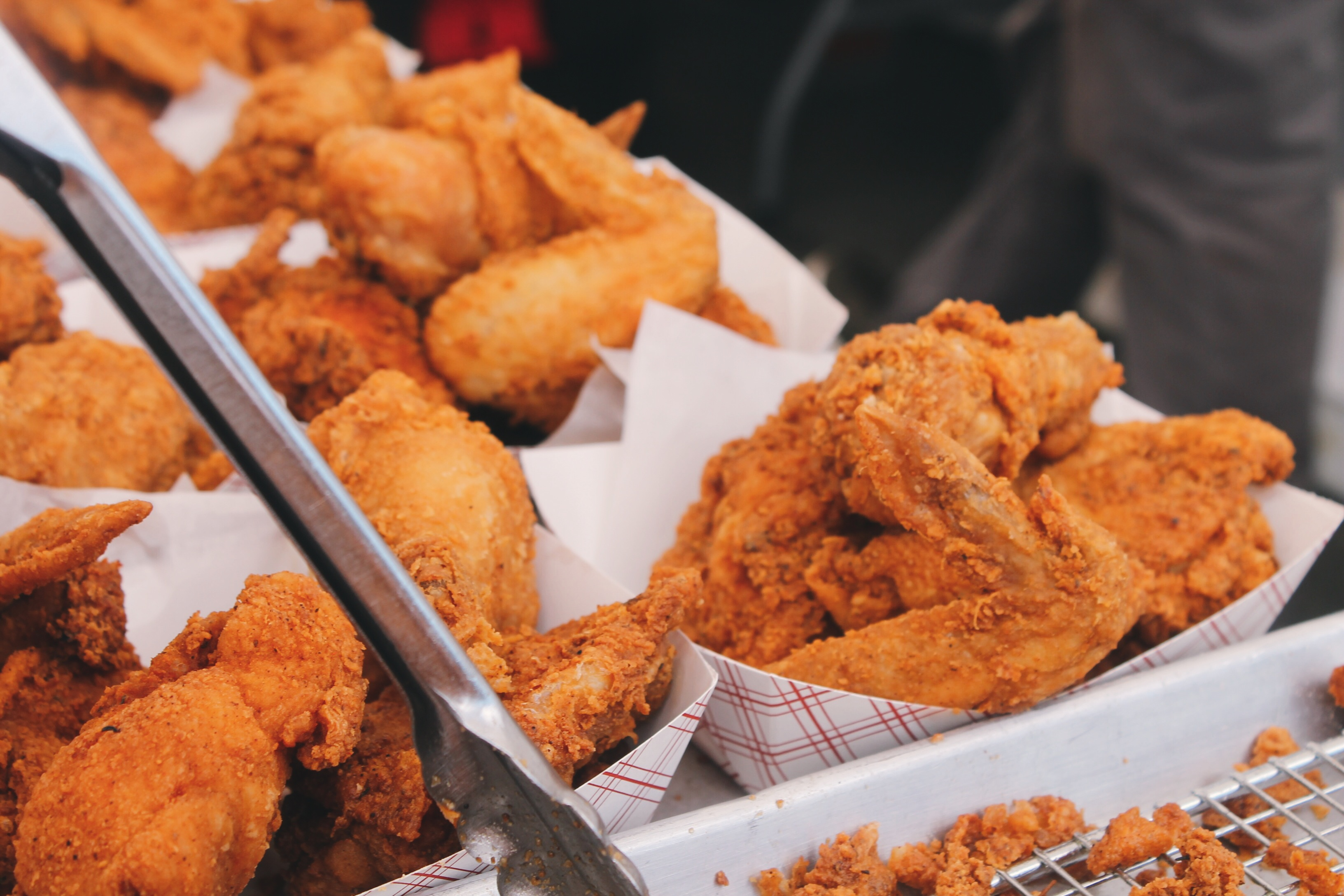
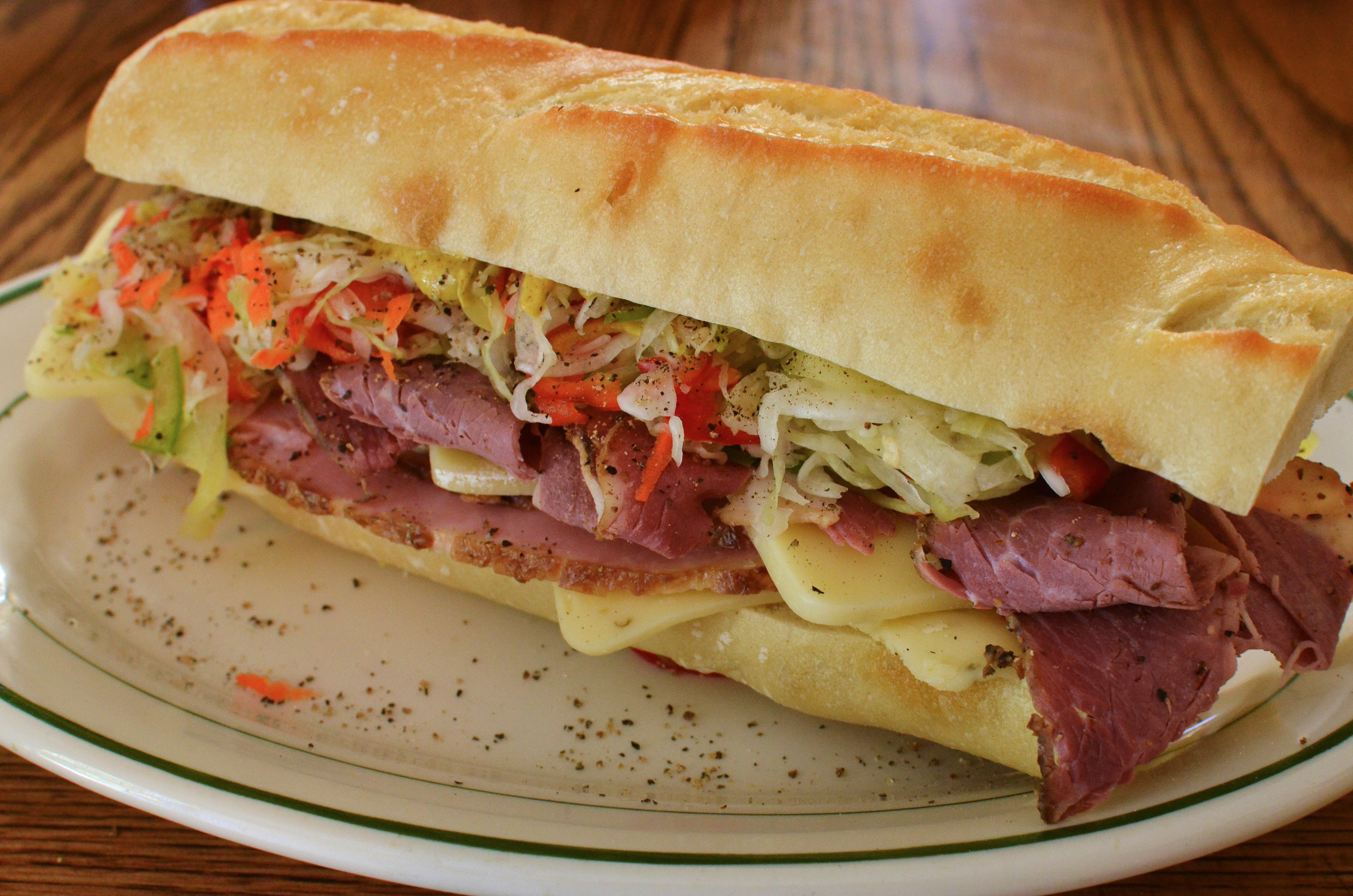
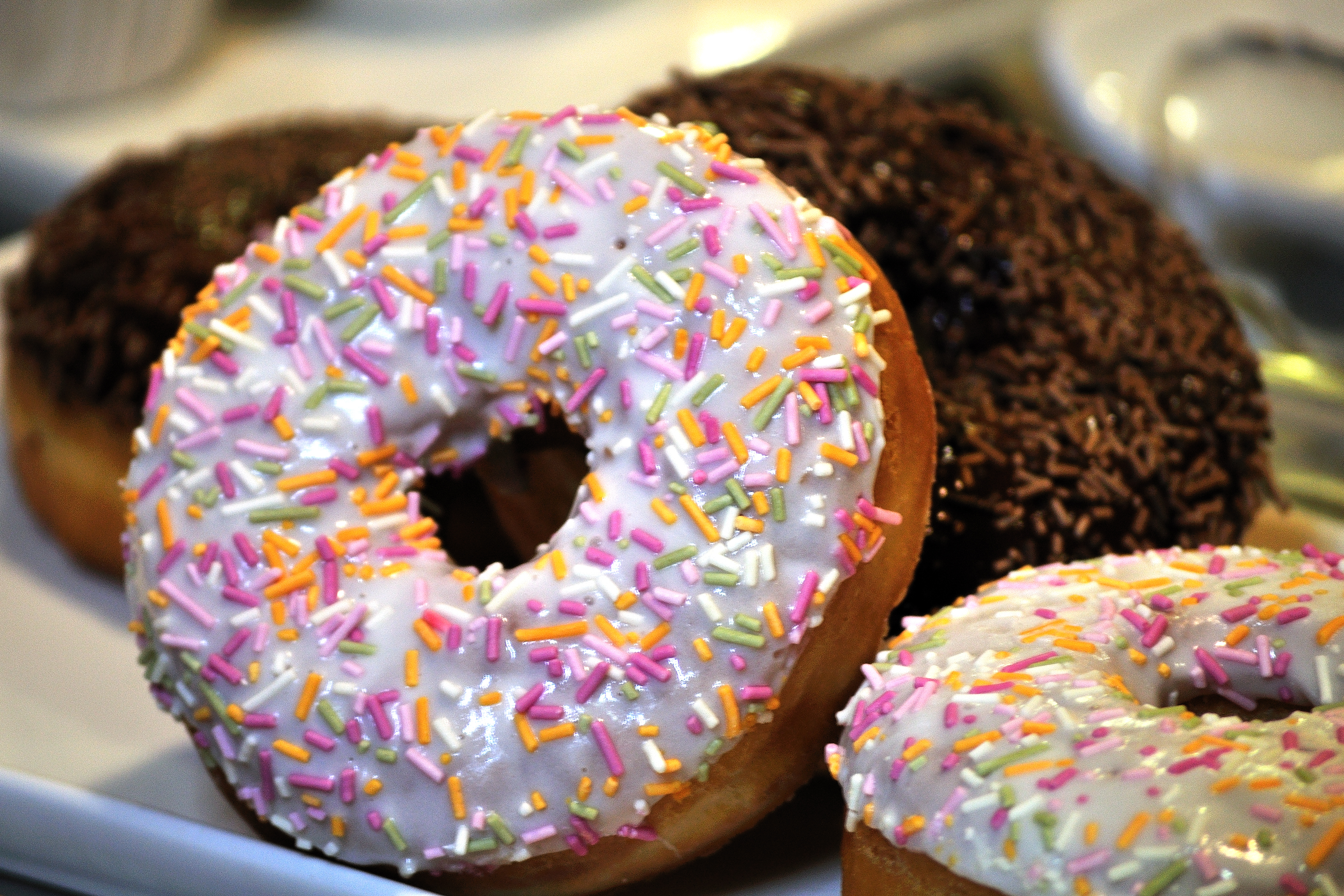
Examples of fast food (left to right, top to bottom): Cheeseburger, meat pie, french fries, pepperoni pizza, hot dog, fried chicken, submarine sandwich, and donuts

Fast food is a type of mass-produced food designed for commercial resale, with a strong priority placed on speed of service. Fast food is a commercial term, limited to food sold in a restaurant or store with frozen, preheated or precooked ingredients and served in packaging for take-out or takeaway. Fast food was created as a commercial strategy to accommodate large numbers of busy commuters, travelers and wage workers. In 2018, the fast-food industry was worth an estimated $570 billion globally.

The fastest form of fast food consists of pre-cooked meals which reduce waiting periods to mere seconds. Other fast-food outlets, primarily hamburger outlets such as McDonald's and Burger King, use mass-produced, pre-prepared ingredients (bagged buns and condiments, frozen beef patties, vegetables which are pre-washed, pre-sliced, or both; etc.) and cook the meat and french fries fresh, before assembling to order.

Fast-food restaurants are traditionally distinguished by the drive-through. Outlets may be stands or kiosks, which may provide no shelter or seating, or fast-food restaurants (also known as quick-service restaurants). Franchise operations that are part of restaurant chains have standardized foodstuffs shipped to each restaurant from central locations.

Many fast foods tend to be high in saturated fat, sugar, salt and calories. Fast-food consumption has been linked to increased risk of cardiovascular disease, colorectal cancer, obesity, high cholesterol, insulin resistance conditions and depression. These correlations remain strong even when controlling for confounding lifestyle variables, suggesting a strong association between fast-food consumption and increased risk of disease and early mortality.

== History ==
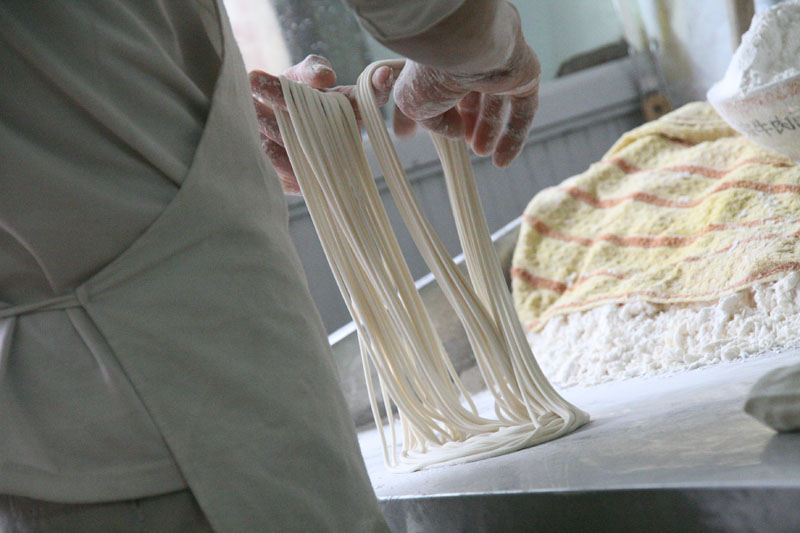
Pulling wheat dough into thin strands to form lamian

The concept of ready-cooked food for sale is closely connected with urban developments. Homes in emerging cities often lacked adequate space or proper food preparation accoutrements. Additionally, procuring cooking fuel could cost as much as purchased produce. Frying foods in vats of searing oil proved as dangerous as it was expensive. Homeowners feared that a rogue cooking fire "might easily conflagrate an entire neighborhood".

Thus, urbanites were encouraged to purchase pre-prepared meats or starches, such as bread or noodles, whenever possible. This also ensured that customers with strictly limited time (a commuter stopping to procure dinner to bring home to their family, for example, or an hourly laborer on a short lunch break) were not inconvenienced by waiting for their food to be cooked on-the-spot (as is expected from a traditional "sit down" restaurant). In Ancient Rome, cities had street stands—a large counter with a receptacle in the middle from which food or drink would have been served.

It was during post-WWII American economic boom that Americans began to spend more and buy more as the economy boomed and a culture of consumerism bloomed. As a result of this new desire to have it all, coupled with the strides made by women while the men were away, both members of the household began to work outside the home. Eating out, which had previously been considered a luxury, became a common occurrence, and then a necessity. Workers, and working families, needed quick service and inexpensive food for both lunch and dinner. The traditional family dinner is increasingly being replaced by the consumption of takeaway fast food. As a result, the time invested on food preparation is getting lower, with an average woman in the United States spending 47 minutes per day preparing food and the average man spending 19 minutes per day in 2013.

=== Pre-industrial Old World ===
In the cities of Roman antiquity, much of the urban population living in insulae, multi-story apartment blocks, depended on food vendors for many of their meals; the Forum itself served as a marketplace where Romans could purchase baked goods and cured meats. In the mornings, bread soaked in wine was eaten as a quick snack and cooked vegetables and stews later in popina, a simple type of eating establishment. In Asia, 12th-century Chinese ate fried dough, soups and stuffed buns, all of which still exist as contemporary snack food. Their Baghdadi contemporaries supplemented home-cooked meals with processed legumes, purchased starches, and even ready-to-eat meats. During the Middle Ages, large towns and major urban areas such as London and Paris supported numerous vendors that sold dishes such as pies, pasties, flans, waffles, wafers, pancakes and cooked meats. As in Roman cities during antiquity, many of these establishments catered to those who did not have means to cook their own food, particularly single households. Unlike richer town dwellers, many often could not afford housing with kitchen facilities and thus relied on fast food. Travelers such as pilgrims en route to a holy site, were among the customers.

=== United Kingdom ===
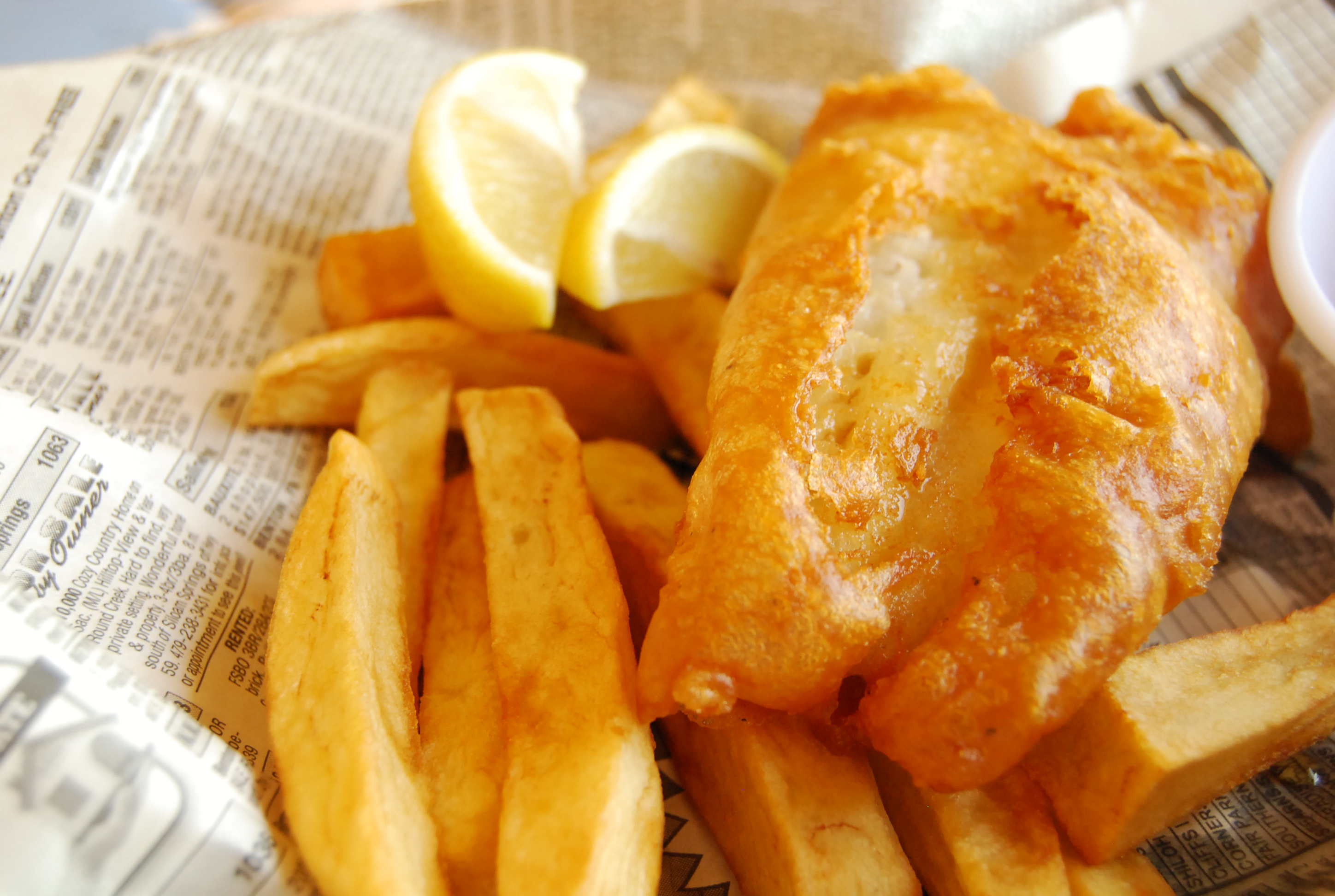
Battered fish and chips, served wrapped in newspaper

In areas with access to coastal or tidal waters, fast food frequently included local shellfish or seafood, such as oysters or, as in London, eels. Often this seafood was cooked directly on the quay or close by. The development of trawler fishing in the mid-nineteenth century led to the development of a British favourite, fish and chips, and the first shop in 1860.

A blue plaque at Oldham's Tommyfield Market marks the origin of the fish and chip shop and fast food industries, with the first chips being fried in the area in the 1860s. As a cheap fast food served in a wrapper, fish and chips became a stock meal among the Victorian working classes. Via the Industrial Revolution, the fish and chip business expanded rapidly in Britain during the 19th century to satisfy the needs of the growing industrial population. By 1910, there were more than 25,000 fish and chip shops across the UK, and in the 1920s there were more than 35,000 shops. Harry Ramsden's fast food restaurant chain opened its first fish and chip shop in Guiseley, West Yorkshire in 1928. On a single day in 1952, the shop served 10,000 portions of fish and chips, earning a place in the Guinness Book of Records.

British fast food had considerable regional variation. Sometimes the regionality of a dish became part of the culture of its respective area, such as the Cornish pasty and deep-fried Mars bar. The content of fast food pies has varied, with poultry (such as chickens) or wildfowl commonly being used. Since the Second World War, turkey has been used more frequently in fast food. The UK has adopted fast food from other cultures as well, such as pizza, doner kebab, and curry. More recently, healthier alternatives to conventional fast food have also emerged.

=== United States ===
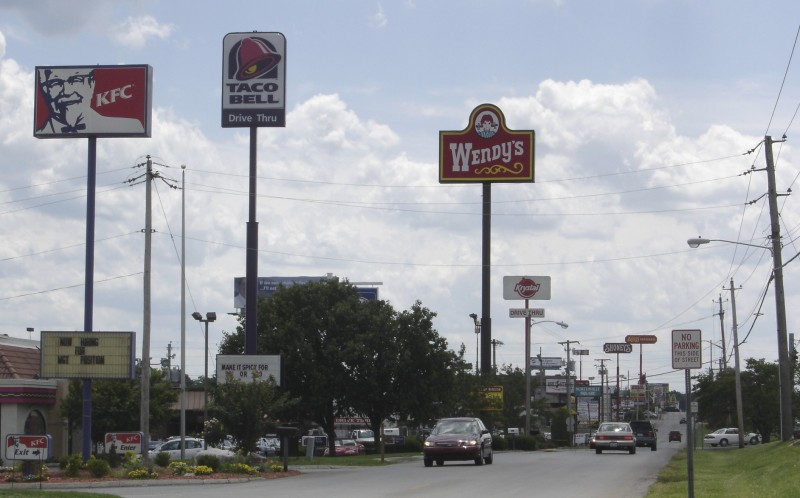
Neighboring fast food restaurant advertisement signs in Bowling Green, Kentucky for Wendy's, KFC, Krystal and Taco Bell. A McDonald's sign can be seen in the very far background.

As automobiles became popular and more affordable following World War I, drive-in restaurants were introduced. The American company White Castle, founded by Billy Ingram and Walter Anderson in Wichita, Kansas in 1921, is generally credited with opening the first fast food outlet and first hamburger chain, selling hamburgers for five cents each. Walter Anderson had built the first White Castle restaurant in Wichita in 1916, introducing the limited menu, high-volume, low-cost, high-speed hamburger restaurant. Among its innovations, the company allowed customers to see the food being prepared. White Castle was successful from its inception and spawned numerous competitors.

Franchising was introduced in 1921 by A&W Root Beer, which franchised its distinctive syrup. Howard Johnson's first franchised the restaurant concept in the mid-1930s, formally standardizing menus, signage and advertising.

Curb service was introduced in the late 1920s and was mobilized in the 1940s when carhops strapped on roller skates.

The United States has the largest fast food industry in the world, and American fast food restaurants are located in over 100 countries. Approximately 5.4 million U.S. workers are employed in the areas of food preparation and food servicing, including fast food in the US as of 2018. Worries of an obesity epidemic and its related illnesses have inspired many local government officials in the United States to propose to limit or regulate fast-food restaurants. Yet, US adults are unwilling to change their fast food consumption even in the face of rising costs and unemployment characterized by the great recession, suggesting an inelastic demand. However, some areas are more affected than others. In Los Angeles County, for example, about 45% of the restaurants in South Central Los Angeles are fast-food chains or restaurants with minimal seating. By comparison, only 16% of those on the Westside are such restaurants.

In 2023, the median age of a fast-food worker was 22, and workers' wages make up about one third of the cost of operating a fast food restaurant.

== On the go ==
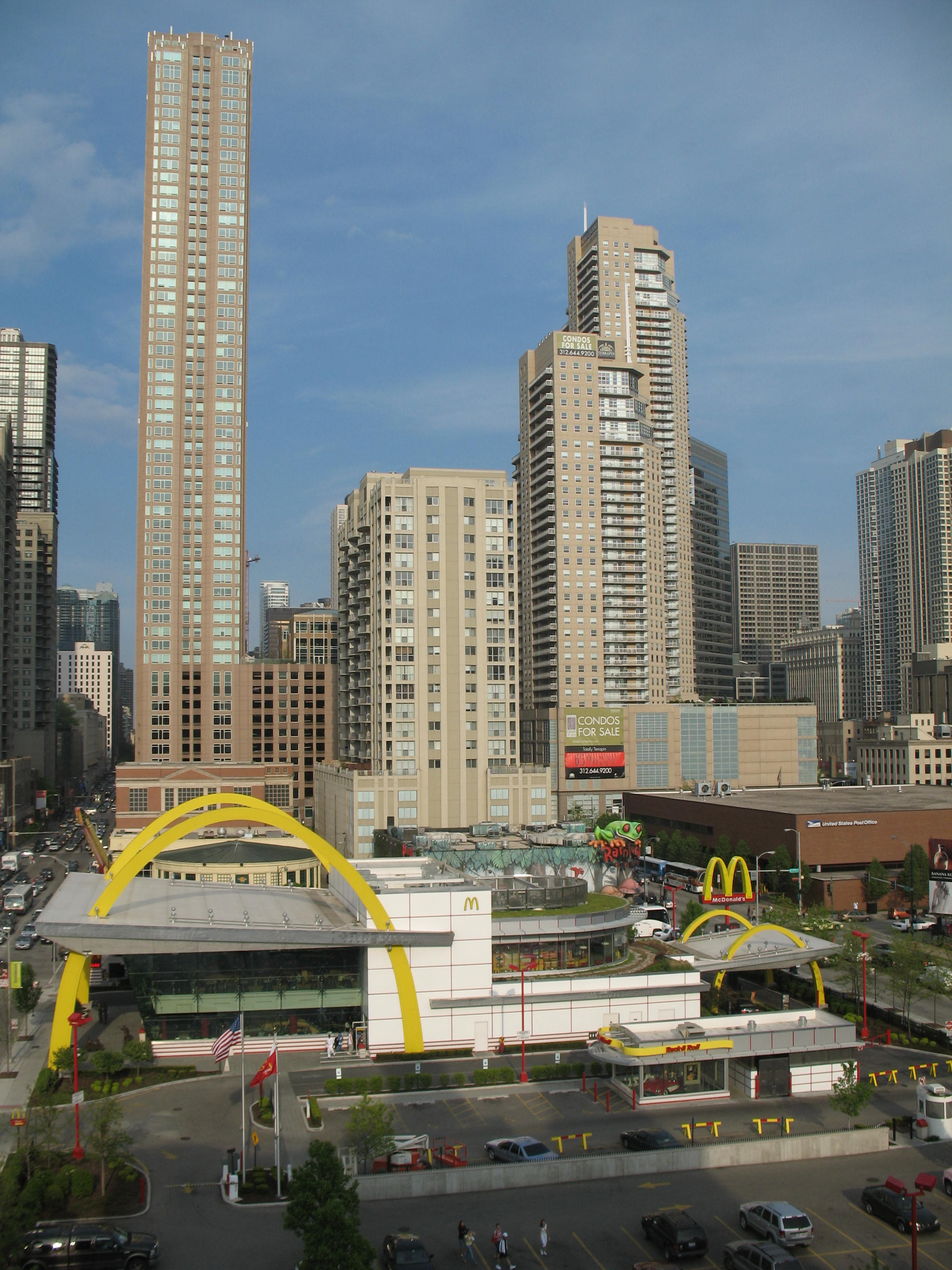
McDonald's first two-lane drive-thru was at the Rock N Roll McDonald's in Chicago.

Fast food outlets are take-away or take-out providers that promise quick service. Such fast food outlets often come with a "drive-through" service that lets customers order and pick up food from their vehicles. Others have indoor or outdoor seating areas where customers can eat on-site. The boom in IT services has allowed customers to order food from their homes through their smartphone apps in recent times.

Nearly from its inception, fast food has been designed to be eaten "on the go," often does not require traditional cutlery, and is eaten as a finger food. Common menu items at fast food outlets include fish and chips, sandwiches, pitas, hamburgers, fried chicken, french fries, onion rings, chicken nuggets, tacos, pizza, hot dogs, and ice cream, though many fast food restaurants offer "slower" foods like chili, mashed potatoes, and salads.

=== Filling stations ===
Convenience stores located within many petrol/gas stations sell pre-packaged sandwiches, doughnuts, and hot food. Many gas stations in the United States and Europe also sell frozen foods, and have microwave ovens on the premises in which to prepare them. Petrol stations in Australia sell foods such as hot pies, sandwiches, and chocolate bars, which are easy for a customer to access while on their journey. Petrol stations are places that are often open long hours and are open before and after shop trading hours, therefore, it makes it easy to access for consumers.

=== Street vendors and concessions ===
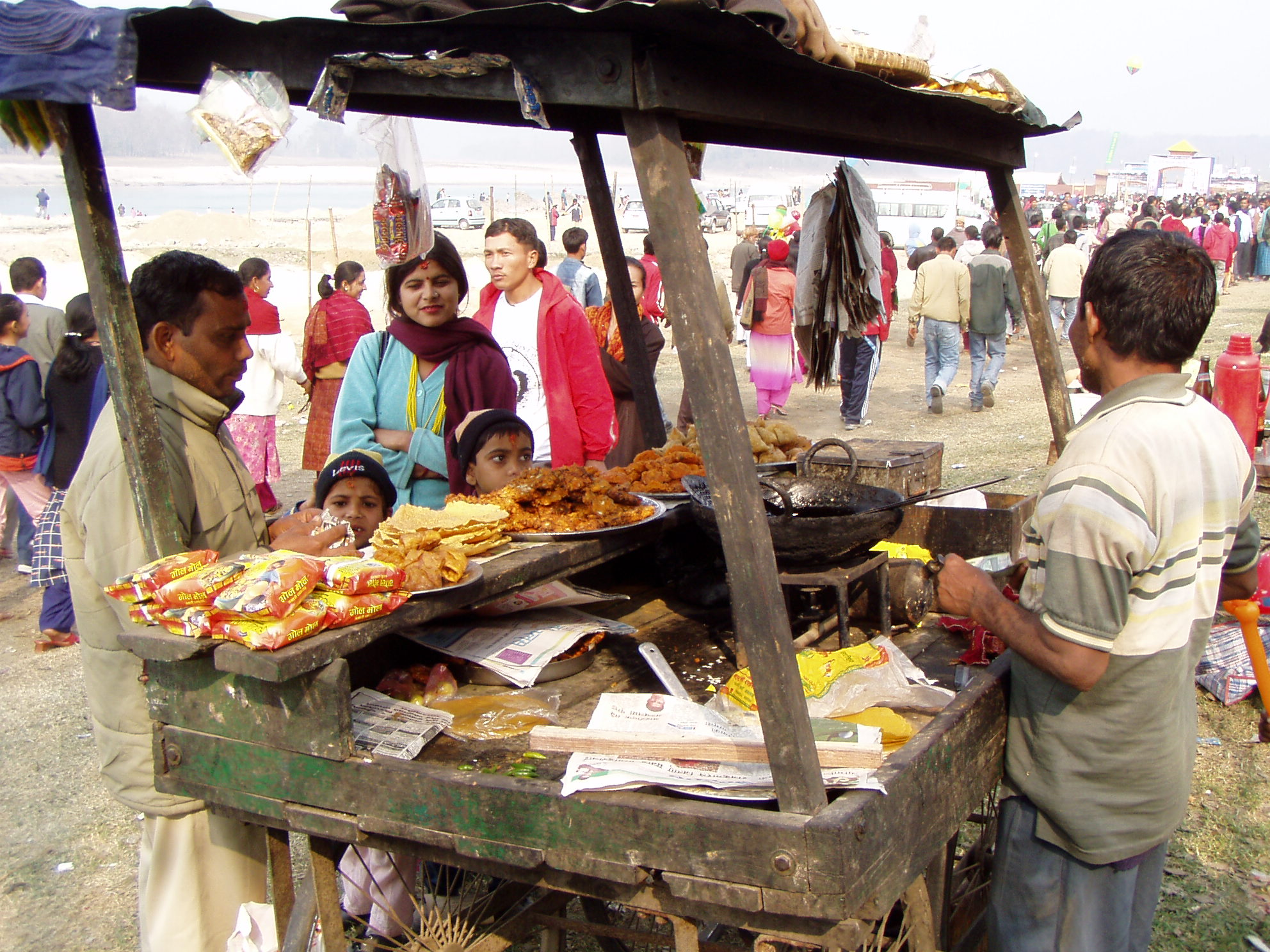
Street vendor serving fast food in Nepal

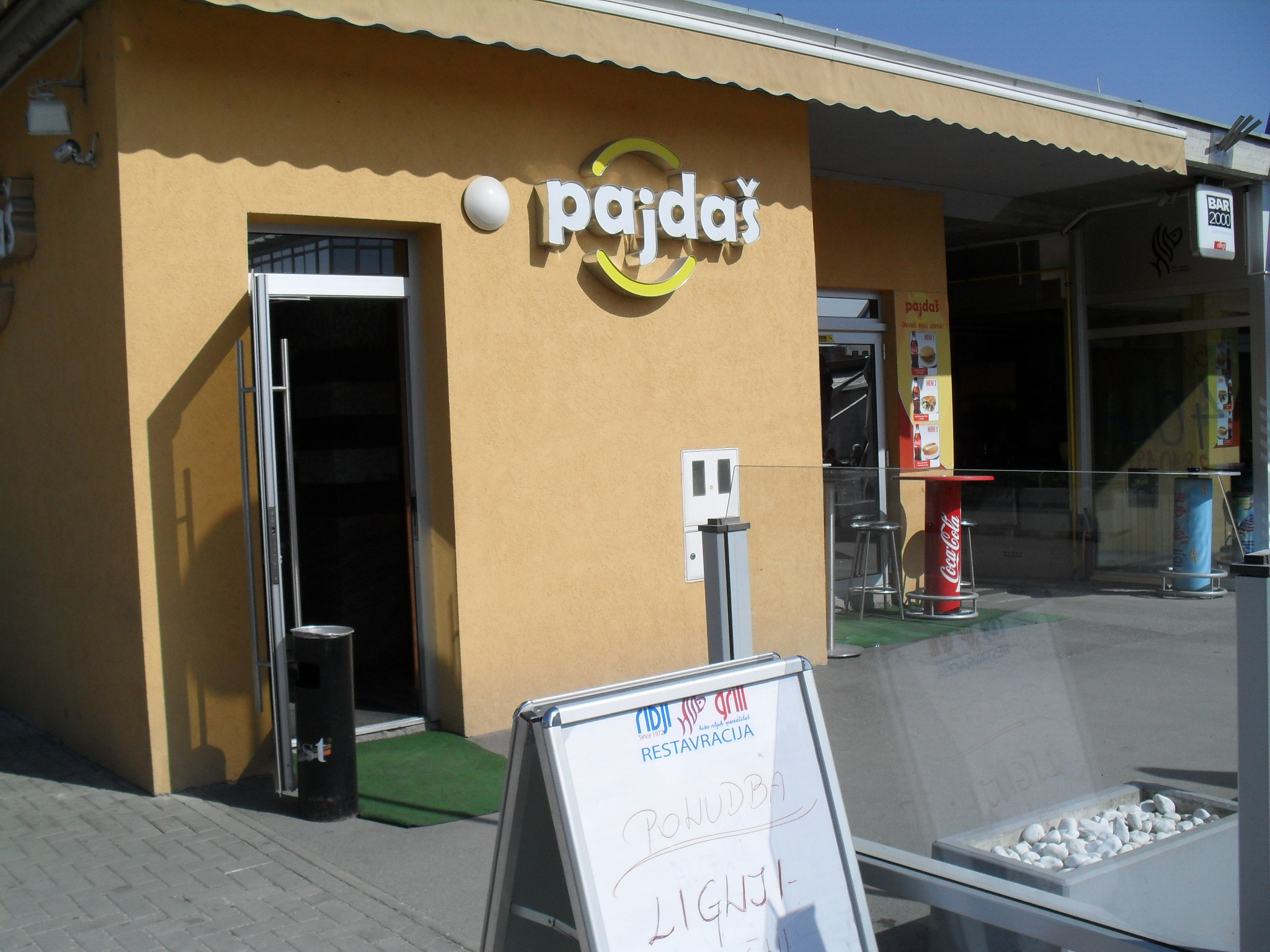
Fast food restaurant in Eastern Europe: The Pajdaš (in Prekmurje Slovene Buddy), Murska Sobota Slovenia.

Traditional street food is available around the world, usually through small and independent vendors operating from a cart, table, portable grill or motor vehicle. Common examples include Chinese rice soup vendors, Middle Eastern falafel stands, New York City hot dog carts, and taco trucks. Turo-Turo vendors (Tagalog for point point) are a feature of Philippine life. Commonly, street vendors provide a colorful and varying range of options designed to captivate passers-by and attract as much attention as possible quickly.

Multiple street vendors may specialize in specific types of food; typically, they are characteristic of a given cultural or ethnic tradition depending on the locale. In some cultures, it is typical for street vendors to call out prices, sing or chant sales-pitches, play music, or engage in other forms of "street theatrics" to engage prospective customers.

== Cuisine ==
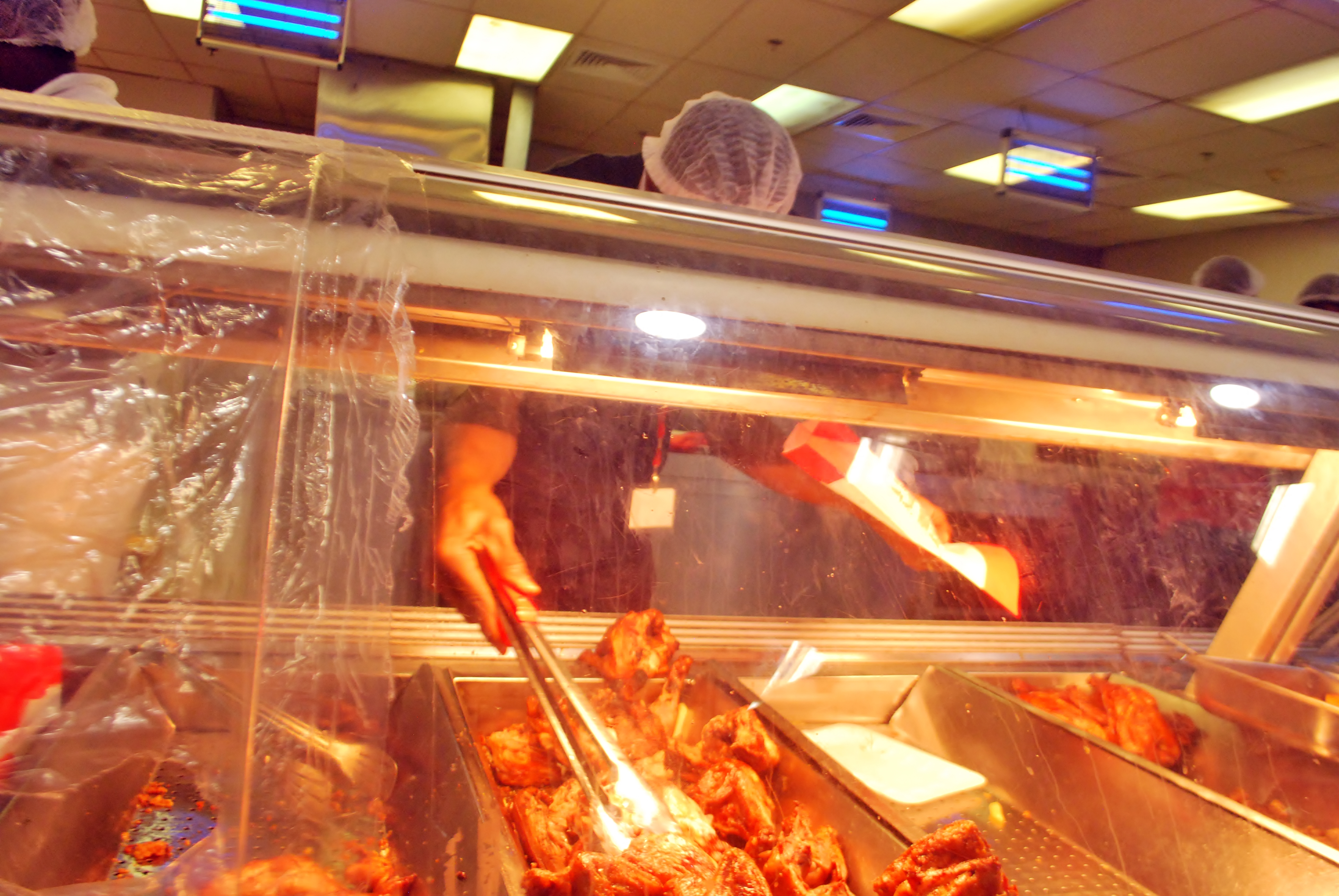
Fast food in Ilorin, Kwara

Modern commercial fast food is often ultra-processed food and prepared in an industrial fashion, i.e., on a large scale with standard ingredients and standardized cooking and production methods. It is usually rapidly served in cartons or bags or in plastic wrapping, in a fashion that minimizes cost. In most fast food operations, menu items are generally made from processed ingredients prepared at a central supply facility and then shipped to individual outlets where they are reheated, cooked (usually by microwave or deep frying) or assembled in a short amount of time. This process ensures a consistent level of product quality. It is key to being able to deliver the order quickly to the customer and eliminate labor and equipment costs in the individual stores.

Because of commercial emphasis on quickness, uniformity and low cost, fast food products are often made with ingredients formulated to achieve a certain flavor or consistency and to preserve freshness.

=== Variants ===
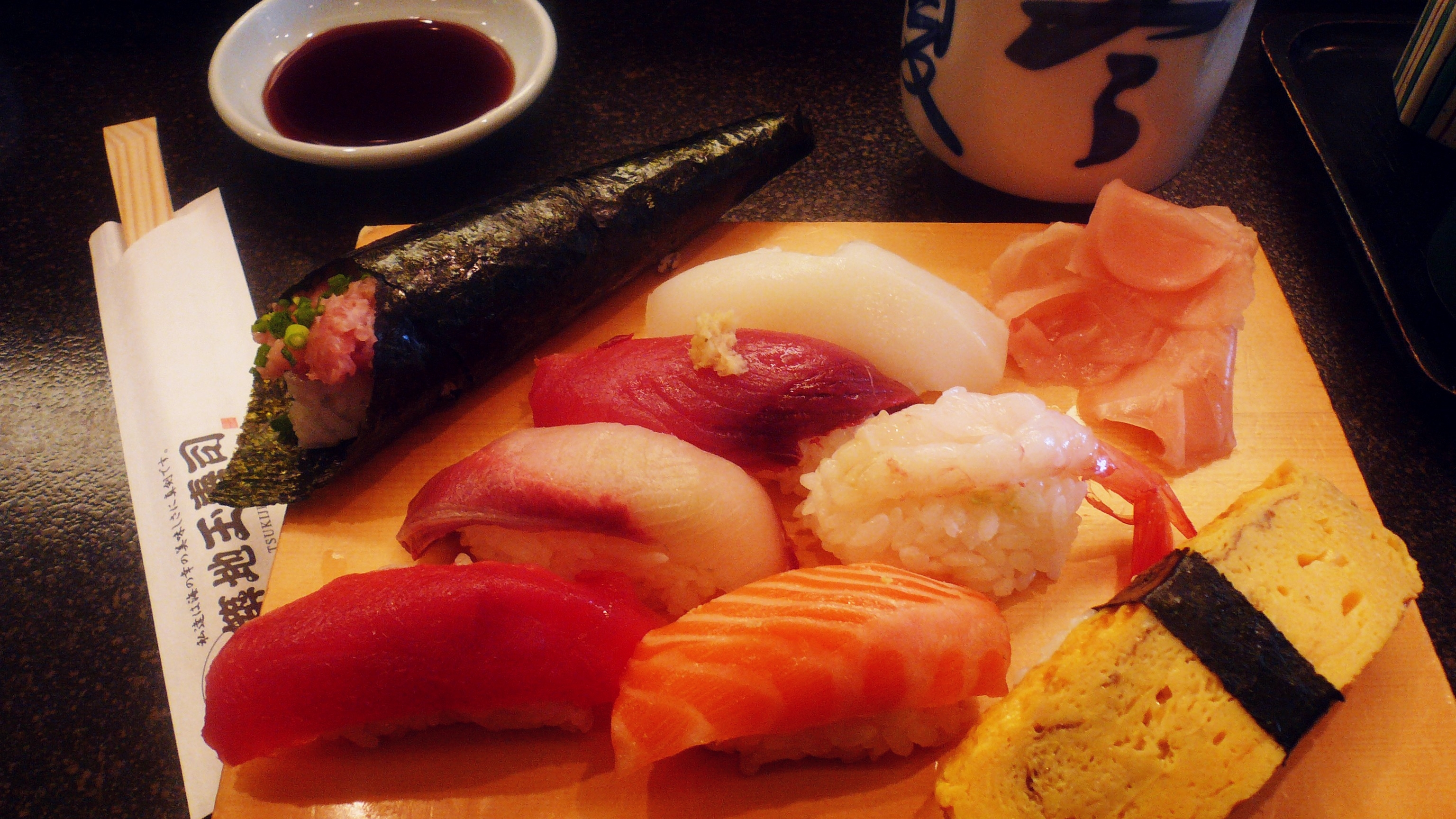
Many types of sushi ready to eat

Chinese takeaways/takeout restaurants are particularly popular in Western countries such as the US and UK. They normally offer a wide variety of Asian food (not always Chinese), which has normally been fried. Most options are some form of noodles, rice, or meat. In some cases, the food is presented as a smörgåsbord, sometimes self service. The customer chooses the size of the container they wish to buy, and then is free to fill it with their choice of food. It is common to combine several options in one container, and some outlets charge by weight rather than by item. In large cities, these restaurants may offer free delivery for purchases over a minimum amount.

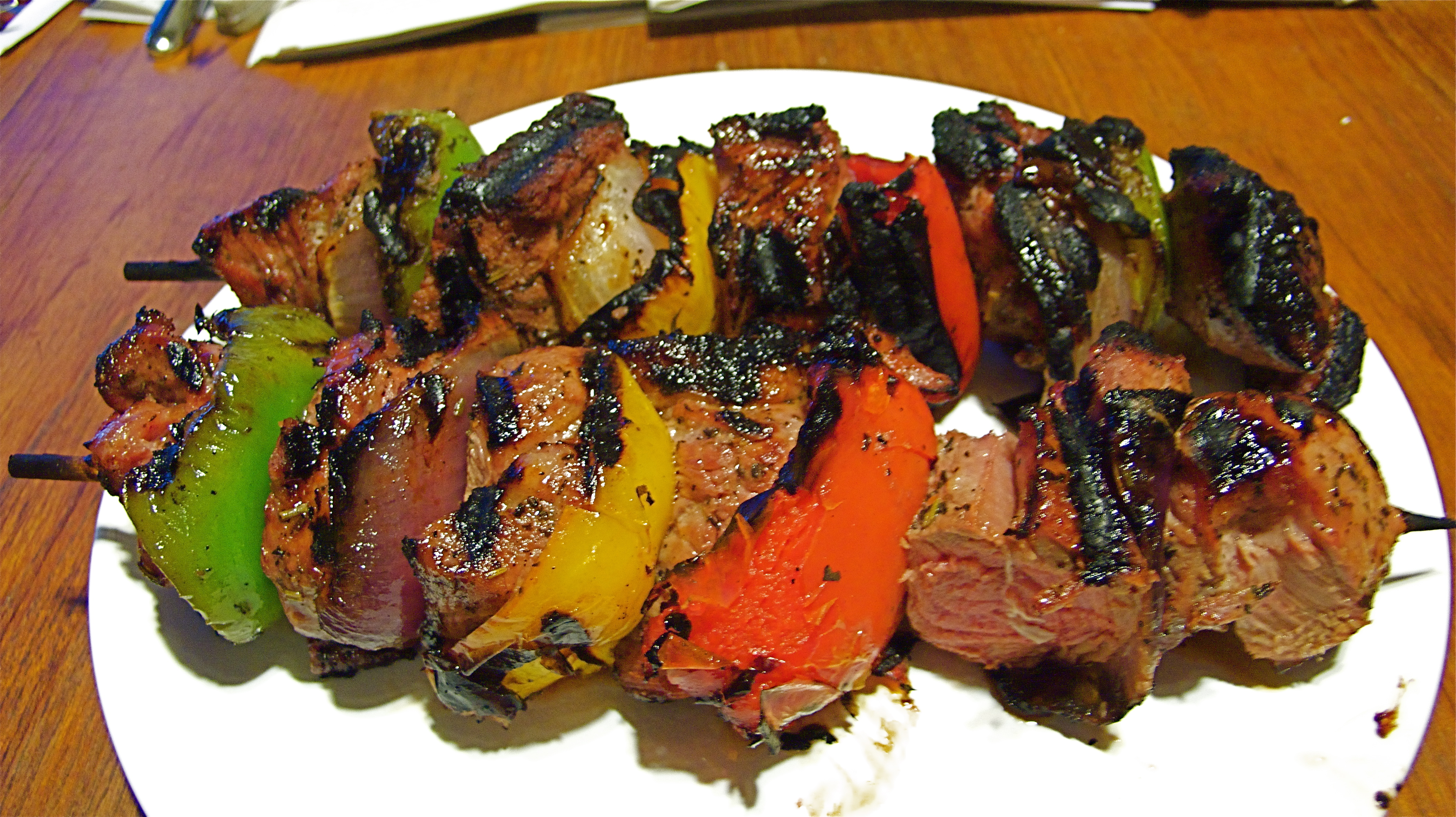
Lamb shish kebab

Sushi has seen rapidly rising popularity recently in the Western world. A form of fast food created in Japan (where bentō is the Japanese variety of fast food), sushi is normally cold sticky rice flavored with a sweet rice vinegar and served with some topping (often fish), or, as in the most popular kind in the West, rolled in nori (dried green laver) with filling. The filling often includes fish, seafood, chicken or cucumber.

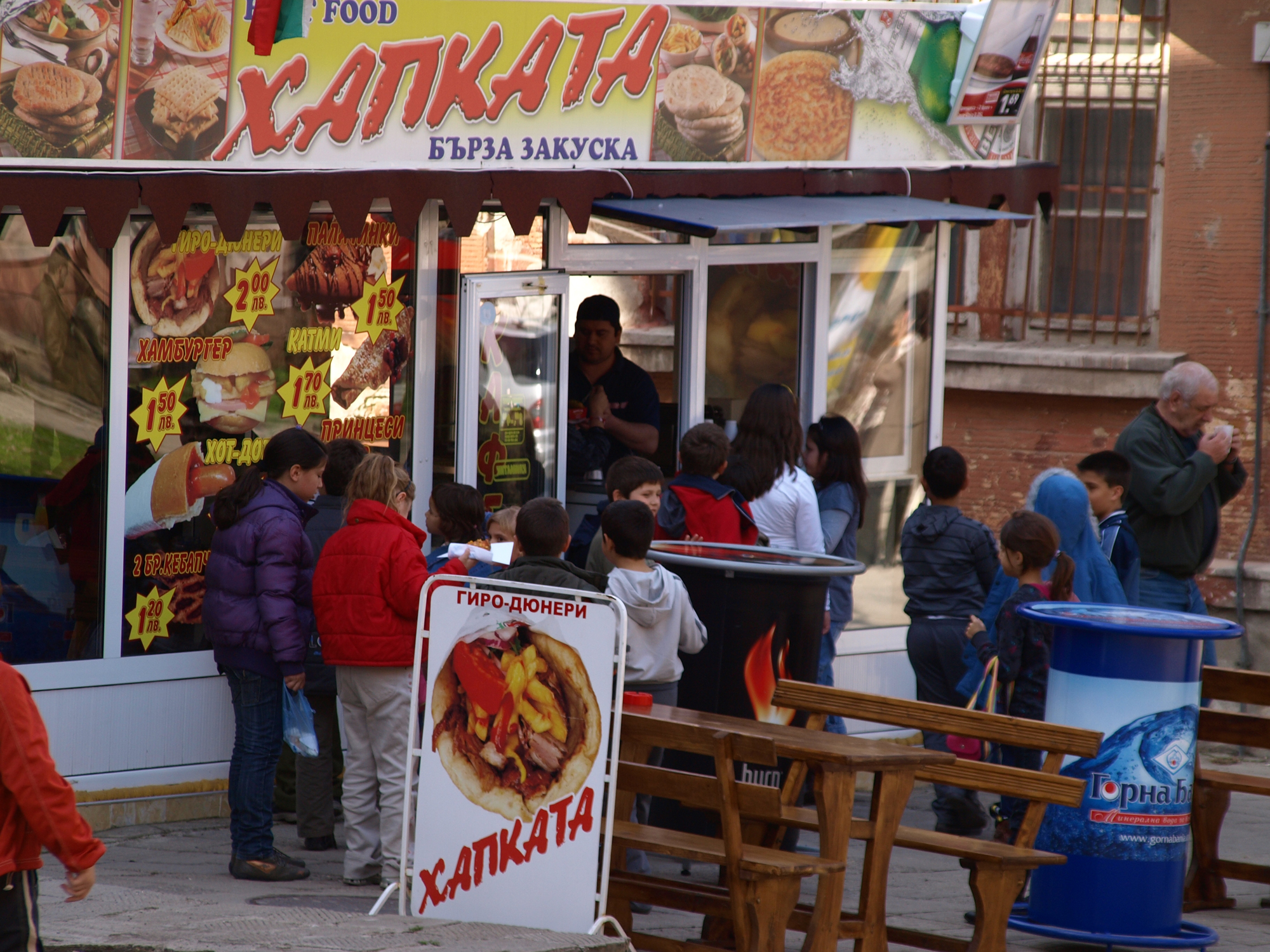
A fast-food kiosk in Yambol, Bulgaria

Pizza is a common fast food category in the United States, with nationwide chains including Papa John's, Domino's Pizza, Sbarro and Pizza Hut. It trails only the burger industry in supplying children's fast food calories. Menus are more limited and standardized than in traditional pizzerias, and pizza delivery is offered.

Kebab houses are a form of fast food restaurant from the Middle East, especially Turkey and Lebanon. Meat is shaven from a rotisserie, and is served on a warmed flatbread with salad and a choice of sauce and dressing. These doner kebabs or shawarmas are distinct from shish kebabs served on sticks. Kebab shops are also found throughout the world, especially Europe, New Zealand and Australia but they generally are less common in the US.

Fish and chip shops are a form of fast food popular in the United Kingdom, Australia and New Zealand. Fish is battered and then deep-fried, and served with deep-fried potato strips.

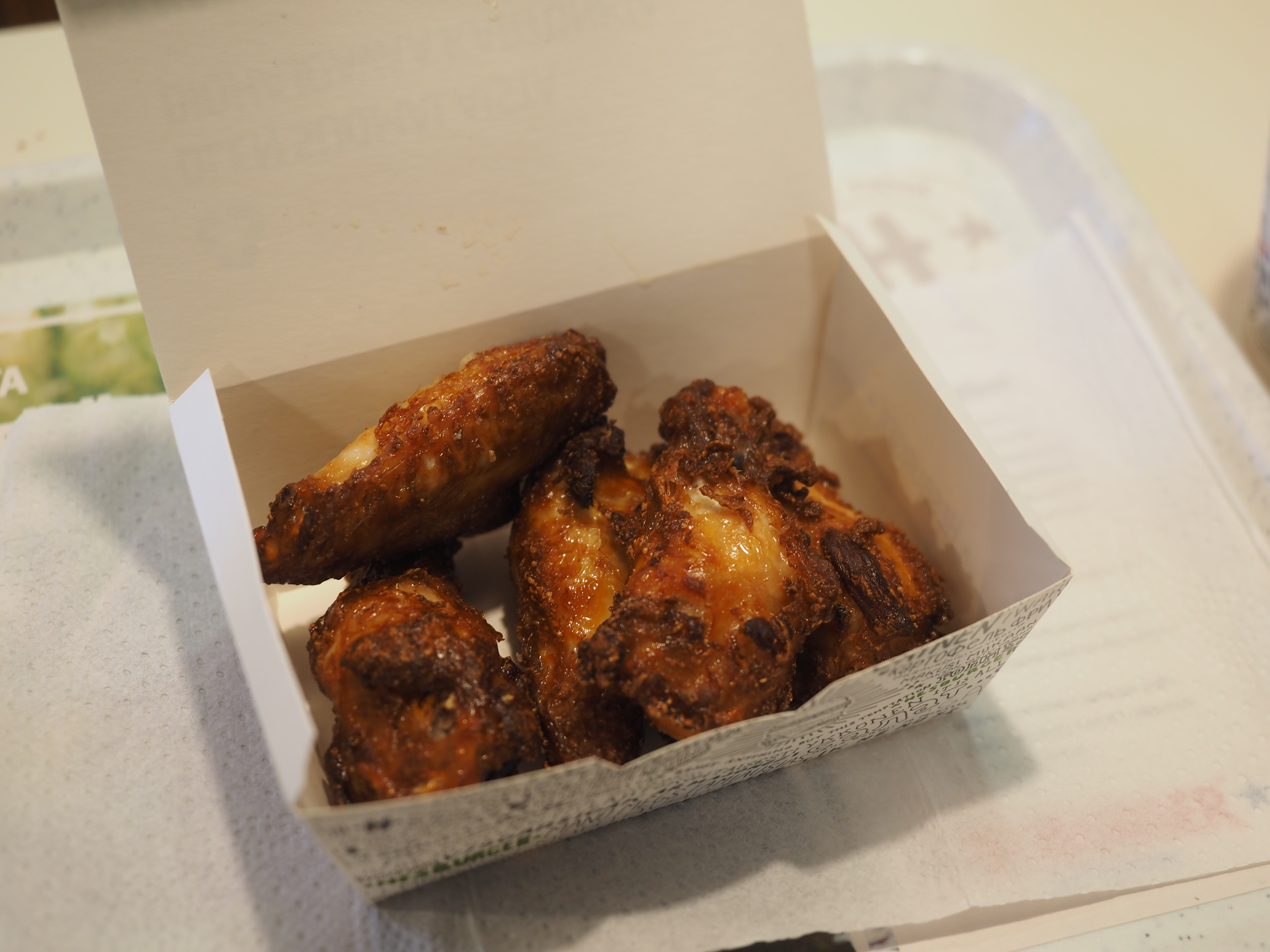
A box of five chicken wings, served at a Hesburger fast food restaurant in Helsinki, Finland

The Dutch have their own types of fast food. A Dutch fast food meal often consists of a portion of french fries (called friet or patat) with a sauce and a meat product. The most common sauce to accompany french fries is fritessaus. It is a sweet, vinegary and low fat mayonnaise substitute, that the Dutch nevertheless still call "mayonnaise". When ordering it is very often abbreviated to met (literally "with"). Other popular sauces are ketchup or spiced ketchup ("curry"), Indonesian-style peanut sauce ("satésaus" or "pindasaus") or piccalilli. Sometimes the fries are served with combinations of sauces, most famously speciaal (special): mayonnaise, with (spiced) ketchup and chopped onions; and oorlog (literally "war"): mayonnaise and peanut sauce (sometimes also with ketchup and chopped onions). The meat product is usually a deep-fried snack; this includes the frikandel (a deep-fried skinless minced meat sausage), and the kroket (deep-fried meat ragout covered in breadcrumbs).

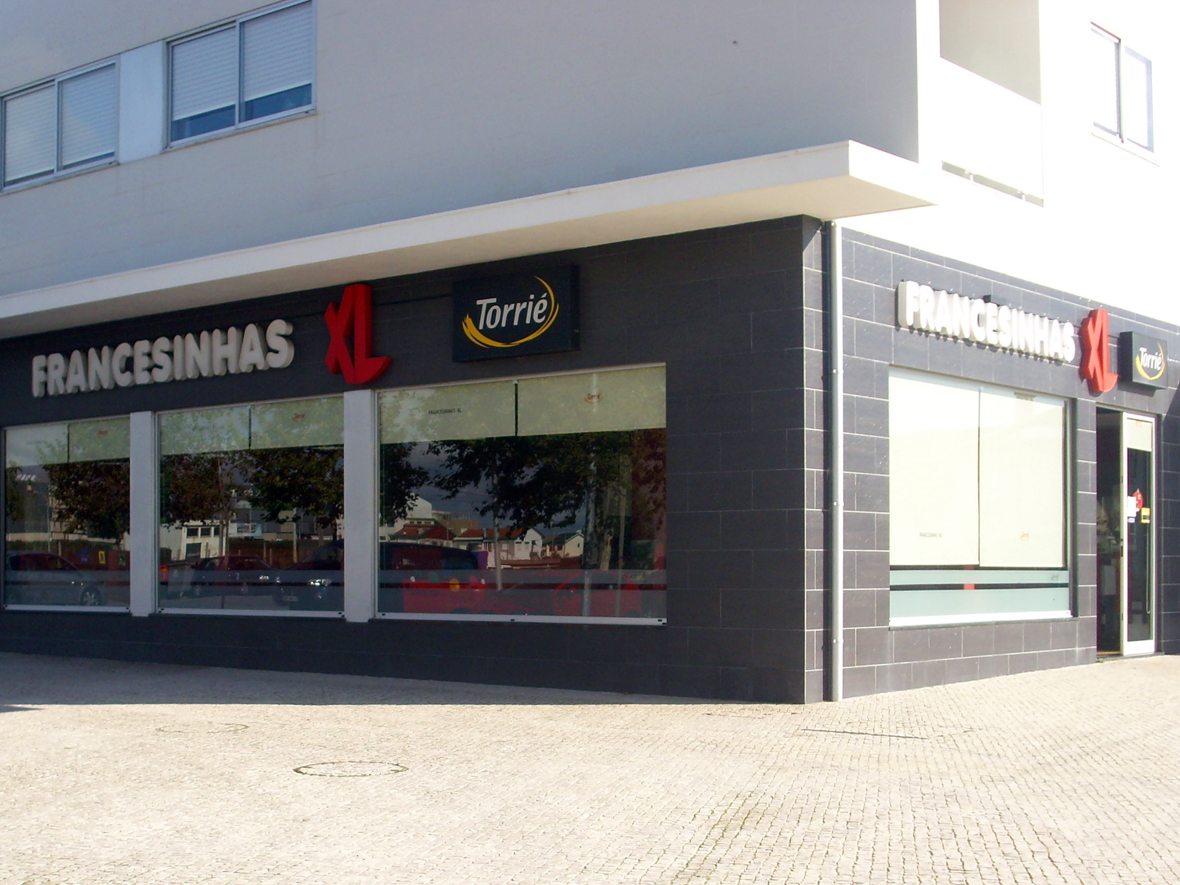
Fast-food place in Portugal

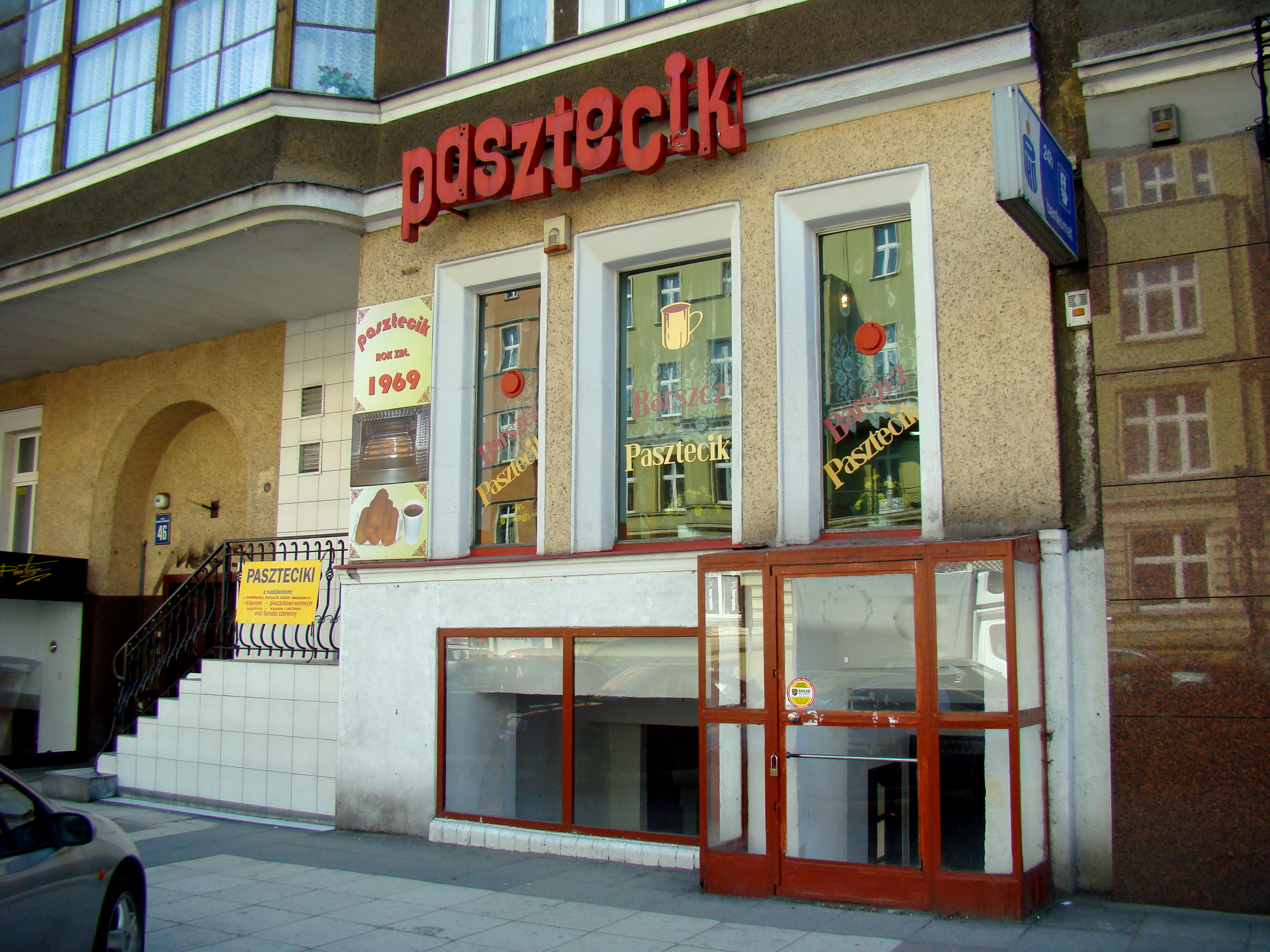
A small restaurant with pasztecik szczeciński in Szczecin, Poland

In Portugal, there are some varieties of local fast-food and restaurants specialized in this type of local cuisine. Some of the most popular foods include frango assado (Piri-piri grilled chicken previously marinated), francesinha, francesinha poveira, espetada (turkey or pork meat on two sticks) and bifanas (pork cutlets in a specific sauce served as a sandwich). This type of food is also often served with french fries (called batatas fritas), some international chains started appearing specialized in some of the typical Portuguese fast food such as Nando's.

An example of a local form of fast food in Poland is pasztecik szczeciński, a deep-fried yeast dough stuffed with meat or vegetarian filling, typical fast food dish of the city of Szczecin well known in many other cities in the country. A dish is on Polish List of traditional products. The first bar serving pasztecik szczeciński, Bar "Pasztecik" founded in 1969, is located on Wojska Polskiego Avenue 46 in Szczecin.

A fixture of East Asian cities is the noodle shop. Flatbread and falafel are today ubiquitous in the Middle East. Popular Indian fast food dishes include vada pav, panipuri and dahi vada. In the French-speaking nations of West Africa, roadside stands in and around the larger cities continue to sell—as they have done for generations—a range of ready-to-eat, char-grilled meat sticks known locally as brochettes (not to be confused with the bread snack of the same name found in Europe)

== Business ==
In the United States, consumers spent $160 billion on fast food in 2012 (up from $6 billion in 1970). In 2013, the US restaurant industry had total projected sales of $660.5 billion. Fast food has been losing market share to fast casual dining restaurants, which offer more robust and expensive cuisines. Due to this competition, fast food giants have seen dramatic drops in their sales. While overall fast food sales have fallen, the number of Americans who eat in these restaurants "once a month or 'a few times a year'" has risen.

In contrast to the rest of the world, American citizens spend a much smaller amount of their income on food — largely due to various government subsidies that make fast food cheap and easily accessible. Calorie for calorie, foods sold in fast food restaurants cost less and is more energy-dense, and is made mostly of products that the government subsidizes heavily: corn, soy, and beef.

The Australian fast food market is valued at more than 2.7 billion GPB and is composed of 1.4 billion fast food meals. This includes meals serviced at 17,000 fast food outlets. The fast food market has experienced an average annual growth rate of 6.5 percent, which is the most rapidly growing sector of the retail food market.

== Employment ==
According to the U.S. Bureau of Labor Statistics, about 4.1 million U.S. workers are employed in food preparation and serving (including fast food) as of 2010. The BLS's projected job outlook expects average growth and excellent opportunity as a result of high turnover. However, in April 2011, McDonald's hired approximately 62,000 new workers and received a million applications for those positions—an acceptance rate of 6.2%. The median age of workers in the industry in 2013 was 28. Obtaining Human Resource Management diploma or diploma in Fast Food Management can help to get a job in major fast food restaurants since it is one of the most desired.

== Globalization ==
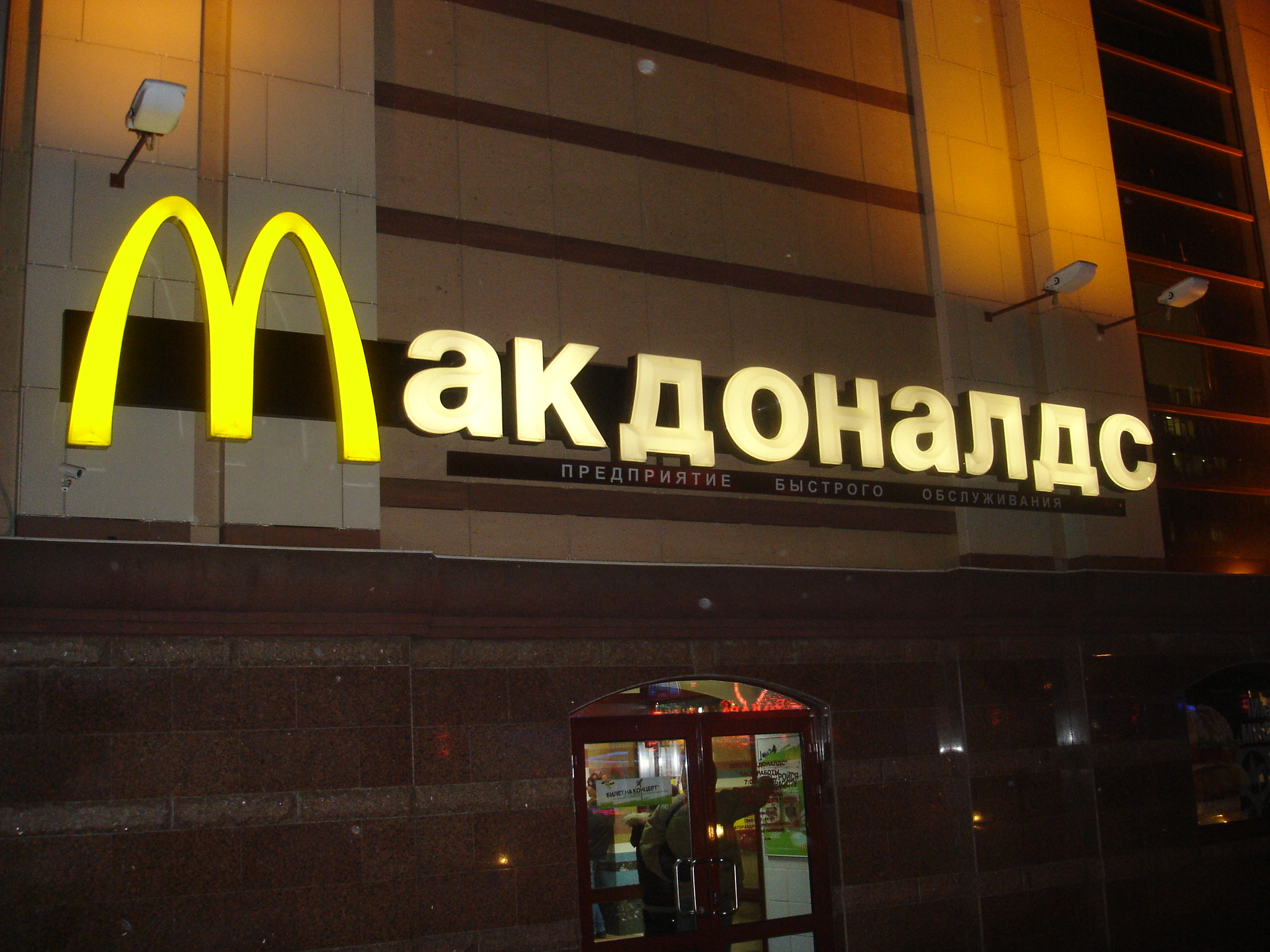
McDonald's in Russia

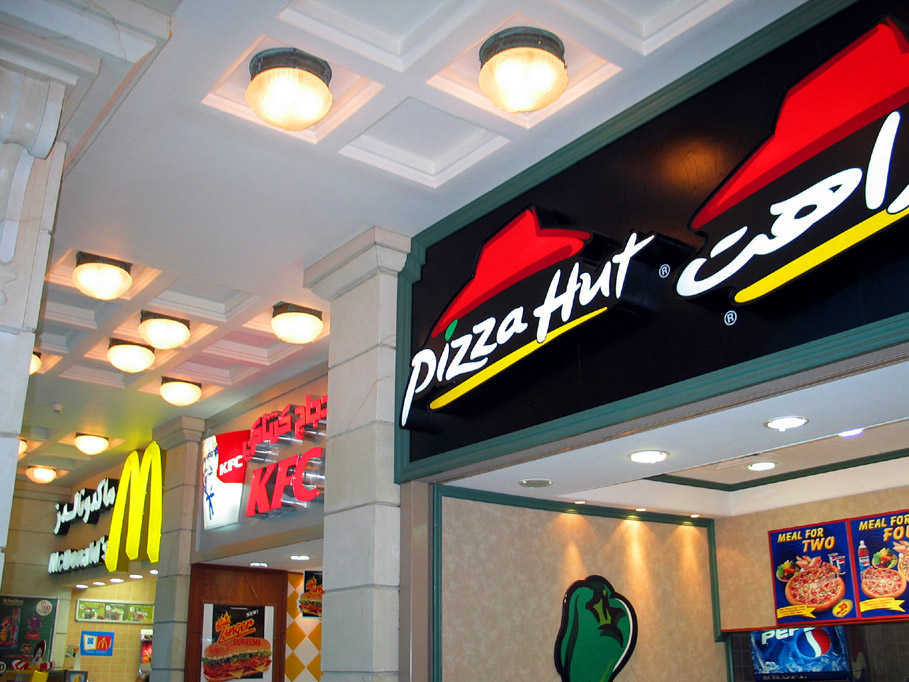
McDonald's, Kentucky Fried Chicken, and Pizza Hut fast food restaurants in the United Arab Emirates

In 2006, the global fast-food market grew by 4.8% and reached a value of £102.4 billion and a volume of 80.3 billion transactions. McDonald's alone, has outlets in 126 countries on 6 continents and operates over 31,000 restaurants worldwide.

One example of McDonald's expansion on a global scale was its introduction to the Russian market. In order for the American business to succeed, it would have to be accepted and integrated into the daily lives of natives in Moscow. Thus, the restaurant was strategically implemented so that its offerings would align with the distinct and established eating habits, also known as the customs around food, eating and cooking, of Muscovites. One significant characteristic of Russian food culture is the emphasis on knowing about the locality of goods that are consumed. Essentially, in order to successfully launch this American brand in a foreign country, McDonald's interpreted the local interests of consumers in Moscow by promoting the origins of the produce used in the restaurant. On January 31, 1990, McDonald's opened a restaurant in Moscow and broke opening-day records for customers served.

The largest McDonald's in the world is located in Orlando, Florida, United States.

There are numerous other fast food restaurants located across the world. Burger King has more than 11,100 restaurants in more than 65 countries. KFC is located in 25 countries. Subway is one of the fastest growing franchises in the world with approximately 39,129 restaurants in 90 countries as of May 2009, the first non-US location opening in December 1984 in Bahrain. Wienerwald has spread from Germany into Asia and Africa. Pizza Hut is located in 97 countries, with 100 locations in China. Taco Bell has 278 restaurants located in 14 countries besides the United States.

== Criticism ==
Fast-food chains have come under criticism over concerns ranging from claimed negative health effects, alleged animal cruelty, cases of worker exploitation, and claims of cultural degradation via shifts in people's eating patterns away from traditional foods.

The intake of fast food is increasing worldwide. A 2010 study undertaken in the city of Jeddah indicated that fast-food habits were related to an increased level of obesity among adolescents in Saudi Arabia. In 2014, the World Health Organization published a study which indicated that deregulated food markets were largely to blame for an obesity crisis, and suggested tighter regulations to reverse the trend. In the United States, it was reported in 2015 that local governments were restricting fast-food chains by limiting the number of restaurants found in certain geographical areas.

To combat criticism, fast-food restaurants have started to offer an increased number of health-friendly menu items. In addition to health criticisms, there are suggestions for the fast-food industry to become more eco-friendly. The chains have responded by "reducing packaging waste".

Although trying to overcome criticism through healthy options on fast-food menus, Marion Nestle, who serves as the chair of New York University's Department of Nutrition and Food Studies, suggests that fast-food industries intentionally market unhealthy foods to children through advertising options and therefore create customers for life.

Fast foods reportedly have adverse impacts on the health and academic performance of students. In a 2017 study, fifty-six percent of university students in Germany consumed fast food on a weekly basis. The researcher who wrote the 2001 book Fast Food Nation, Eric Schlosser, argued that fast food chains are not only a financial but also a psychological bait, in that the students are lured towards this early employment opportunity knowing little that the time spent on this no-skill-learning job is wasted. The dangerous impacts and consequences regarding the hiring and firing of teenage school-goers in the fast-food industry have also been a point of criticism of the fast-food industry. In a 2010 article in The Atlantic, Kelly Brownwell further supported this argument that Burger King and McDonald's adopted another dangerous practice for marketing to children.

There have been books and films, such as the 2004 film Super Size Me, designed to highlight the potential negative health effects from the overconsumption of fast food, such as its contribution to obesity.

== See also ==
- Fast food in China
- "Fast Food Song"
- Food group
- Junk food
- List of fast food restaurant chains
- List of pizza chains
- List of restaurant terminology
- Lists of foods
- National Center for Health Statistics
- Panic Nation
- Slow Food
- Snack
- Super Size Me
- TV dinner
- Ultra-processed food
- Western pattern diet
