= Podpiwek =

Polish and Lithuanian beverage

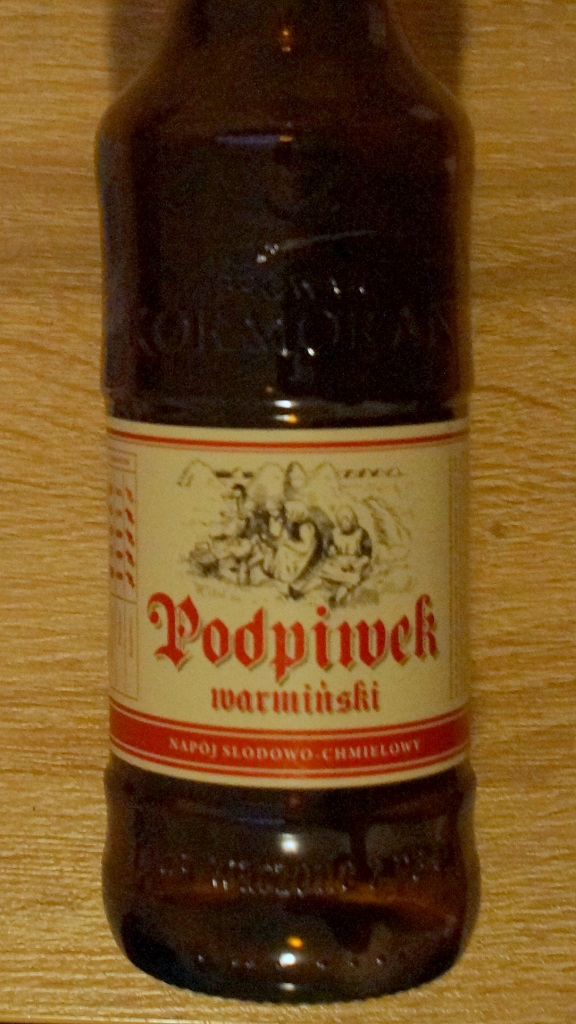
- A bottle of Podpiwek Warminski
- Type: Soft drink
- Manufacturer: Kormoran Brewery, Bakalland, Obolon, Witnica Brewery, Van Pur, and others
- Origin: Poland, Poland
- Alcohol by volume: up to 0,5%
- Colour: Dark brown
- Ingredients: Water, barley malts, sugar, hops, yeast
- Variants: kujawski, warmiński, and others
- Related products: Kvass

Podpiwek is a Polish non-alcoholic beverage (even though it contains a small amount of alcohol, about 0.5%).

It is usually made from grain coffee, hops, yeast, water and sugar, which undergo fermentation.

Often created as a byproduct during beer production, it was a common drink of women and children.

== Famous brands ==
- Podpiwek kujawski
- Podpiwek Jędrzej
- Podpiwek Lubuski
- Podpiwek Obołoń
- Podpiwek warmiński

== See also ==
- Kvass
- Hardaliye
- Malt beer
