= Paprykarz =

Paprykarz is a Polish word that may refer to:

- Chicken paprikash, Hungarian stew
- Paprykarz szczeciński, Polish canned fish spread
