= Hardaliye =

Turkish fermented grape juice drink

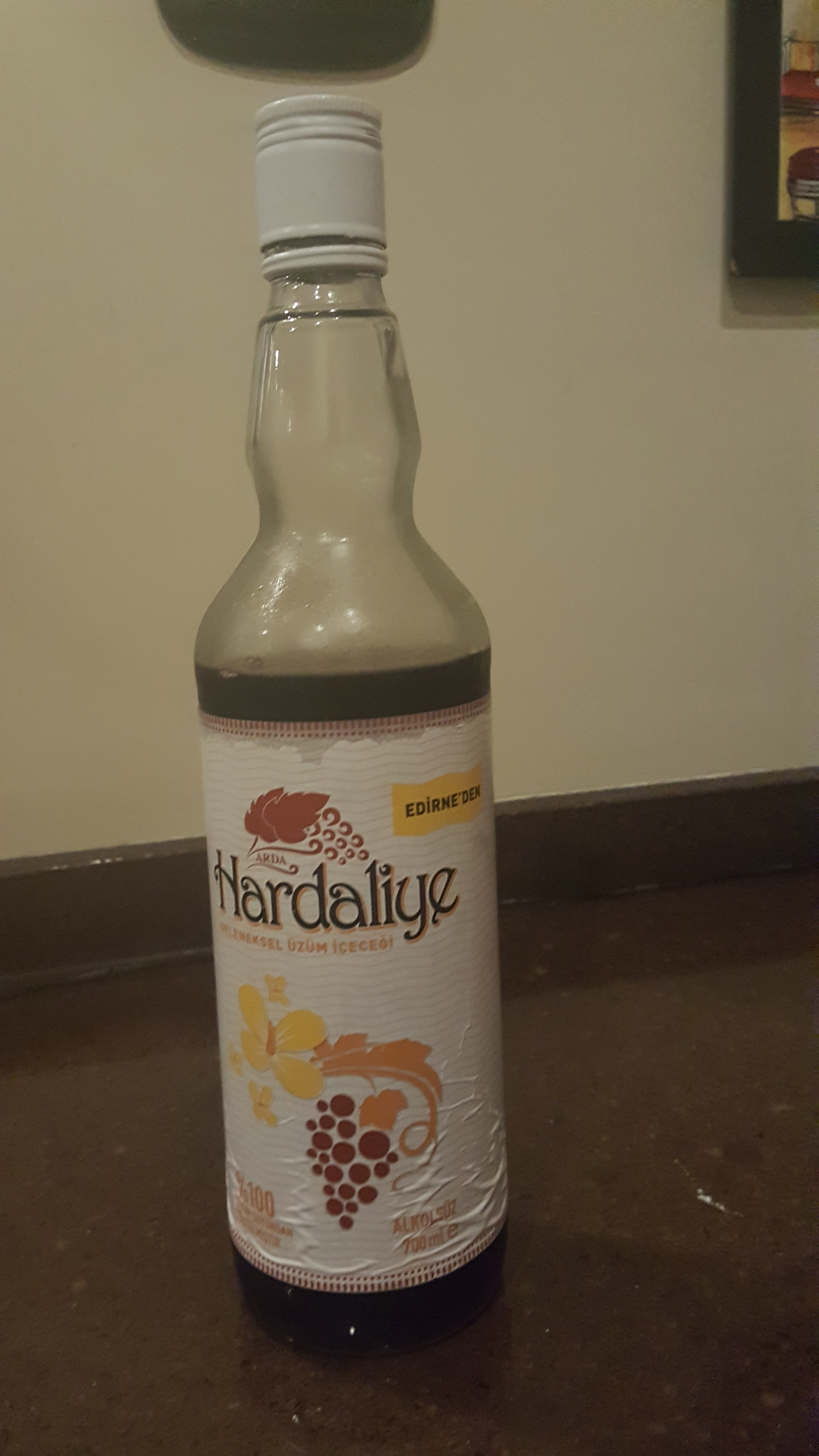

Hardaliye is a lactic acid Turkish drink fermented beverage produced from grapes, crushed mustard seeds, sour cherry leaves, and benzoic acid. It is an indigenous drink of the Trakya region of Turkey in southeastern Europe.

A 2013 study showed that the ingestion of hardaliye had an antioxidant effect in adults.

Hardaliye's nutritional value comes from the grapes as well as the fermentation process. Health benefits of hardaliye can be attributed to etheric oils from the mustard seeds.

== See also ==
- Drakshasava
- Podpiwek
- Şıra
