= Szczecin pasztecik =

Polish deep-fried stuffed yeast dough

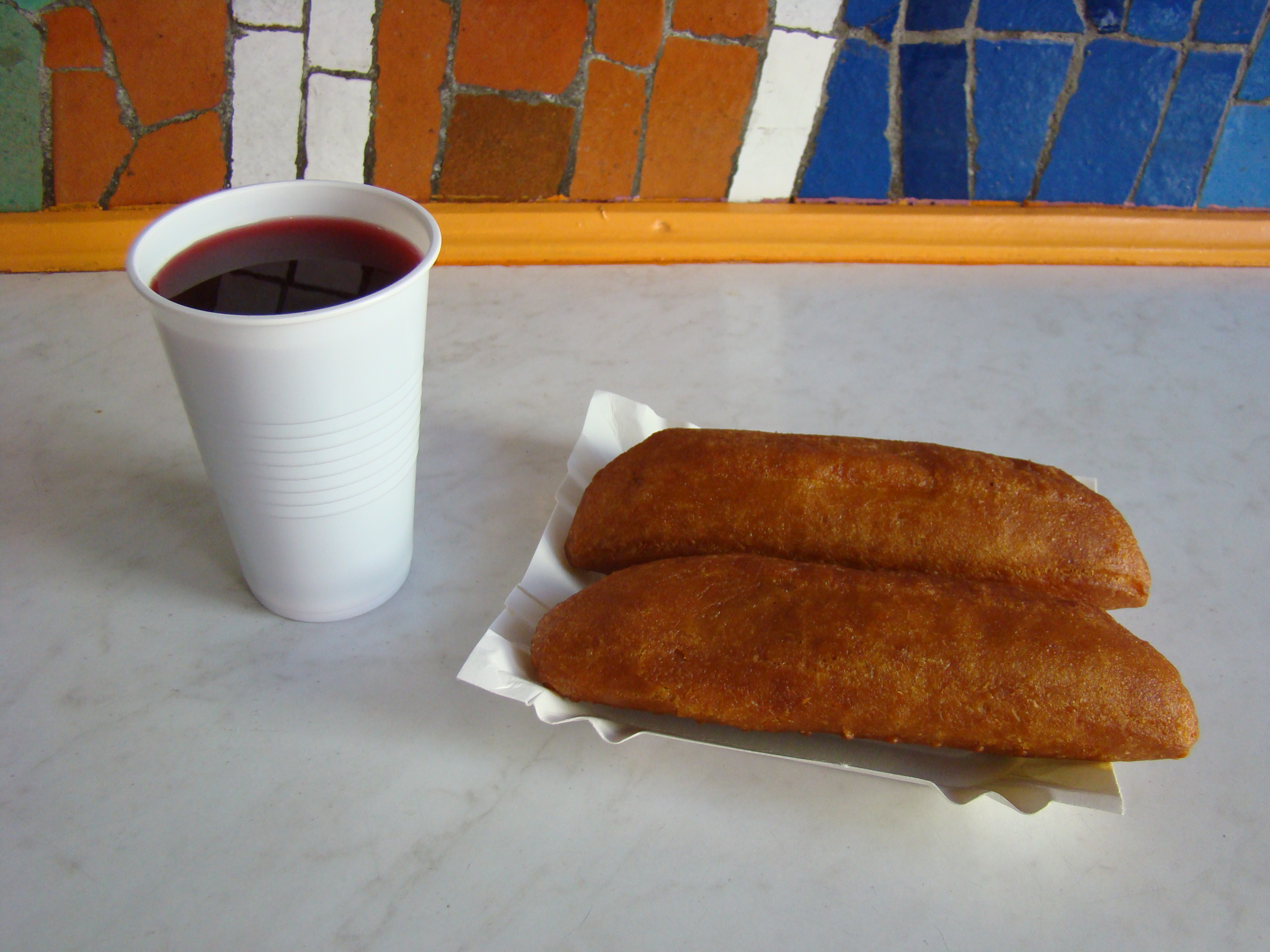
Pasztecik szczeciński served with clear red borscht

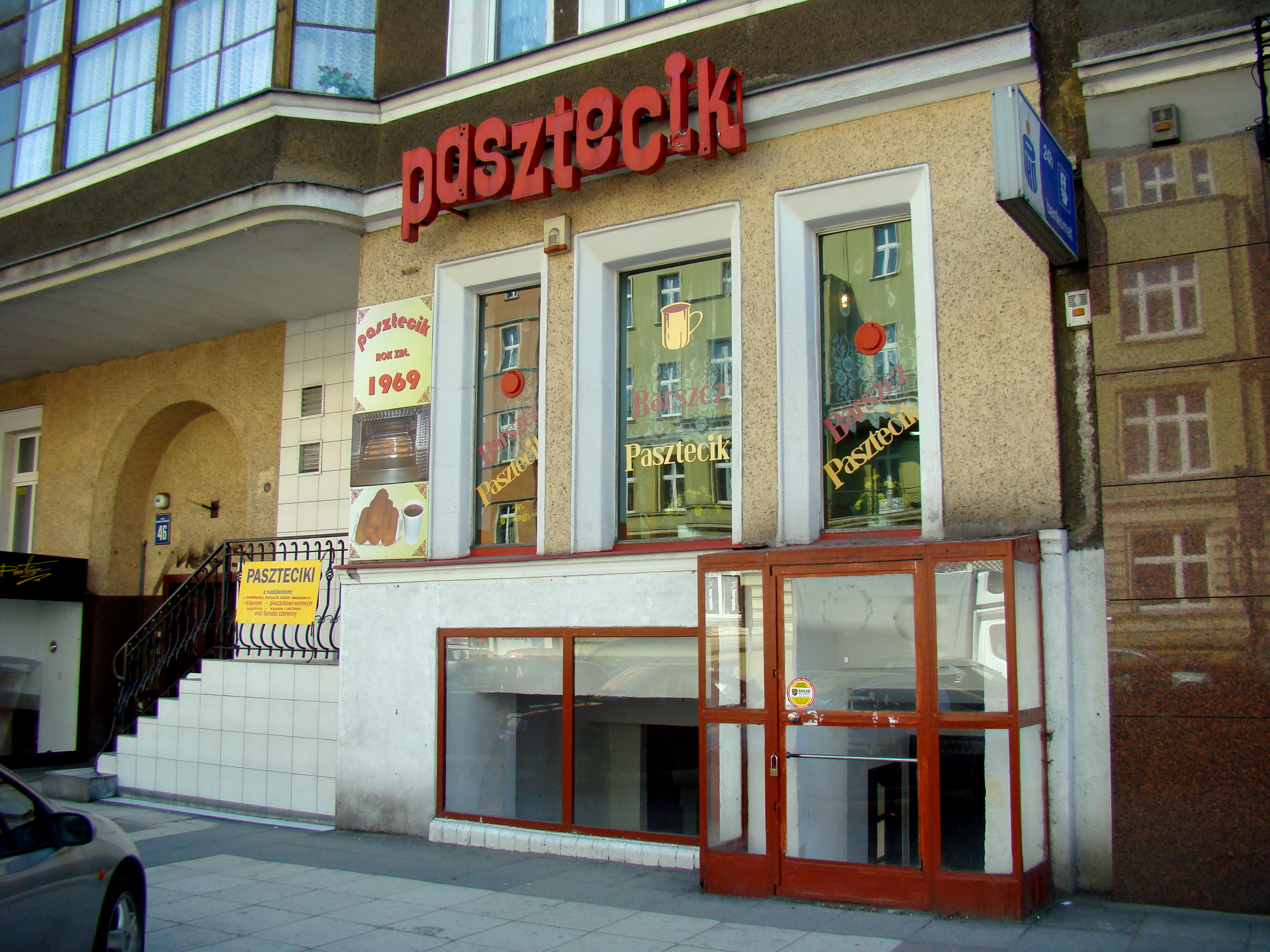
The oldest bar serving paszteciki at Wojska Polskiego Street 46 in Szczecin

Szczecin pasztecik (Note: Polish: pasztecik szczeciński, plural: paszteciki szczecińskie) is a Polish variety of pastry, a machine-produced deep-fried yeast dough stuffed with a meat or vegetarian filling, served in specialised bars as a fast food. It is a traditional snack food dish of Szczecin, where it was popular during the time of the Polish People's Republic and still retains this popularity, having become a cultural food of the region.

The filling consists of either: minced beef (the oldest and the most popular), or sauerkraut and dried mushrooms, or cheese and champignons. During the time of the PPR, when a lack of meat on the market was a frequent occurrence, it was common to replace the meat stuffing with egg paste. The dough is crispy on the outside and soft inside.

The minced beef filling resembles pâté, the Polish word "pasztecik" is a diminutive of the word "pasztet" (pâté). Usually served with clear, spicy red barszcz. It should not be frozen or warmed again.

== History ==
The first bar serving "pasztecik szczeciński", Bar "Pasztecik" (still functioning) was founded in 1969, using machines imported from the Soviet Union army stationed in Szczecin, which could quickly produce large amounts of food for the Soviet soldiers. The machine, weighing over one tonne, is able to produce over 600 pasties in an hour. From 22 December 2010, "pasztecik szczeciński" is listed on the official Polish traditional products list and hence protected by European Union law, which means that all producers have to strictly follow the traditional recipe, however for the authentic flavor and best quality, Bar "Pasztecik" remains number one in Szczecin. Pasztecik Szczeciński is currently served also in other cities in Poland, as well as Wiesbaden in Germany.

From 2015 onwards, 20 October is celebrated as the Day of the pasztecik szczeciński.

== See also ==
- Paprykarz szczeciński
- Bar mleczny
- List of Polish dishes
- Zapiekanka
