= Bakalland =

Polish corporate group of enterprises

- Type: Joint-stock company
- Industry: Food
- Founded: 1996; 30 years ago
- Headquarters: Warsaw, Poland
- Area served: Poland
- Key people: Marek Malinowski
- Revenue: zl 266.73 million
- Website: bakalland.pl

Bakalland S.A. is a corporate group of enterprises specialised in the food industry of dried fruit, of which it holds 24% of the Polish market.

The company is specialised in the import, processing, packaging and distribution of nuts, dried and candied fruit, grain, seeds, fruit, gateau additives, canned vegetables. Between December 11, 2006, to February 10, 2015, the company was registered on the Warsaw Stock Exchange.

According to data from 2008, the largest shareholders of the corporate group were: Anvik Holdings Limited (35.55% at the Warsaw Stock Exchange), chairman Marian Owerko (14.44%) and vice-chairman Artur Ungier (6.55%). The remainder controlled 43.46% of the stock.

In April 2010, Marek Moczulski became the chairman of the corporation, replacing Marian Owerko, the founder and chairman of the company since 1996. In late July 2014, the Office of Competition and Consumer Protection granted the corporation the permission allow Innova Phoenix to acquire Reiber Foods Polska (Delecta) and Bakalland.

== Brands and products ==
- Bakalland – dried fruit, snacks, cake additives.
- BA! – granola snack bars, musli, oatmeal, protein bars.
- Delecta – baking food stuffs, desserts, chicory coffee, culinary additives.
- Mr. Breakfast – oatmeal and porridge oats for children and adults, corn flakes.
- Orico – lunch meals, pâté, paprykarz, Soybean paste in a variety of flavours.
