= Şıra =

Turkish non-alcoholic drink

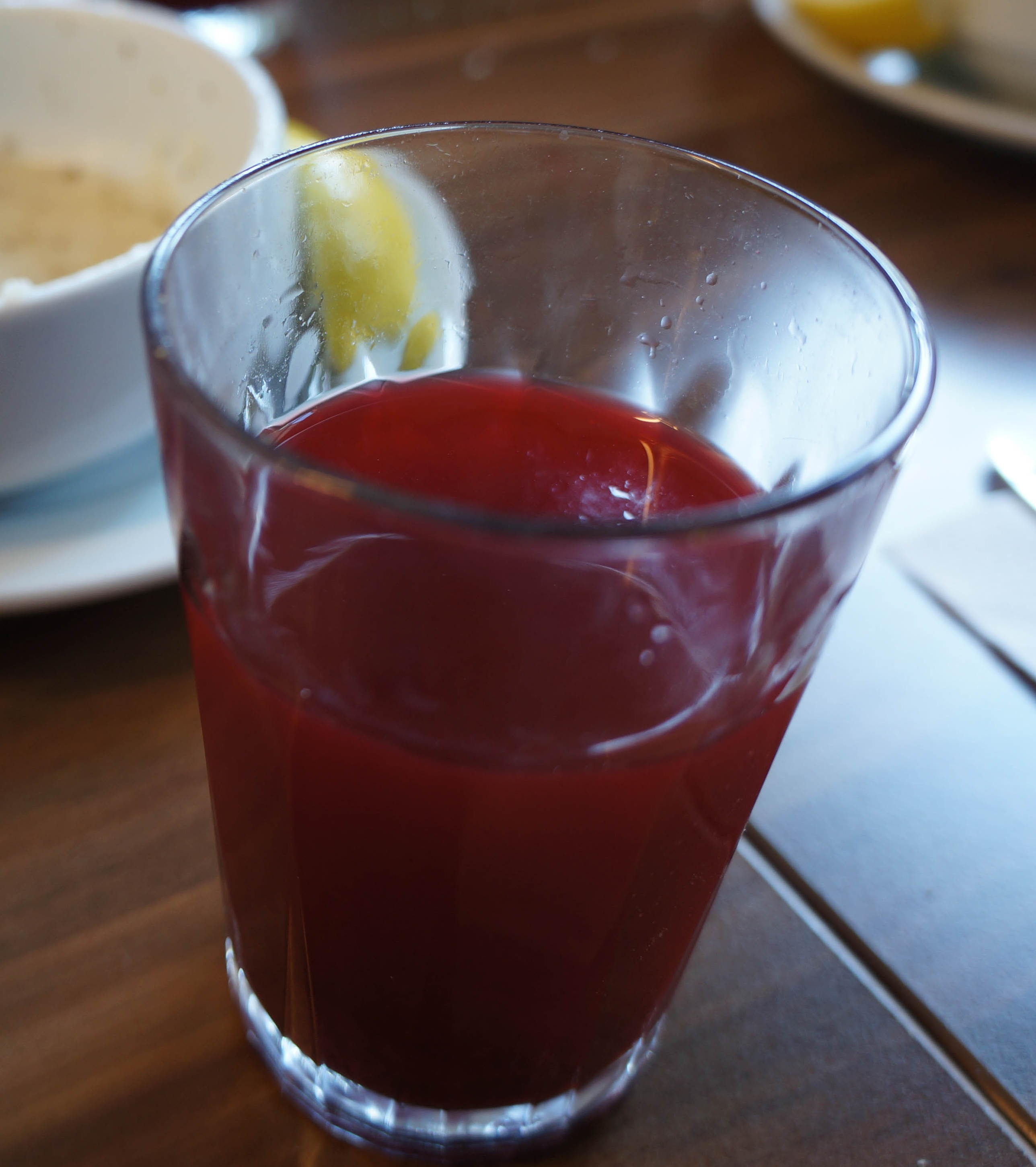

Şıra, şire, or shira is a Turkish non-alcoholic drink made from slightly fermented grape juice. It tastes sweet due to its high fructose content, and it is terracotta in colour. It is mostly served with Iskender kebap.

A flavored version of şıra is served in the Marmara region with the name of hardaliye. Hardaliye is basically a şıra aromatized in mustard seeds and cherry leaves for 15 days. Hardaliye is usually served in special occasions as an appetizer.
