= Bifana =

Portuguese pork sandwich

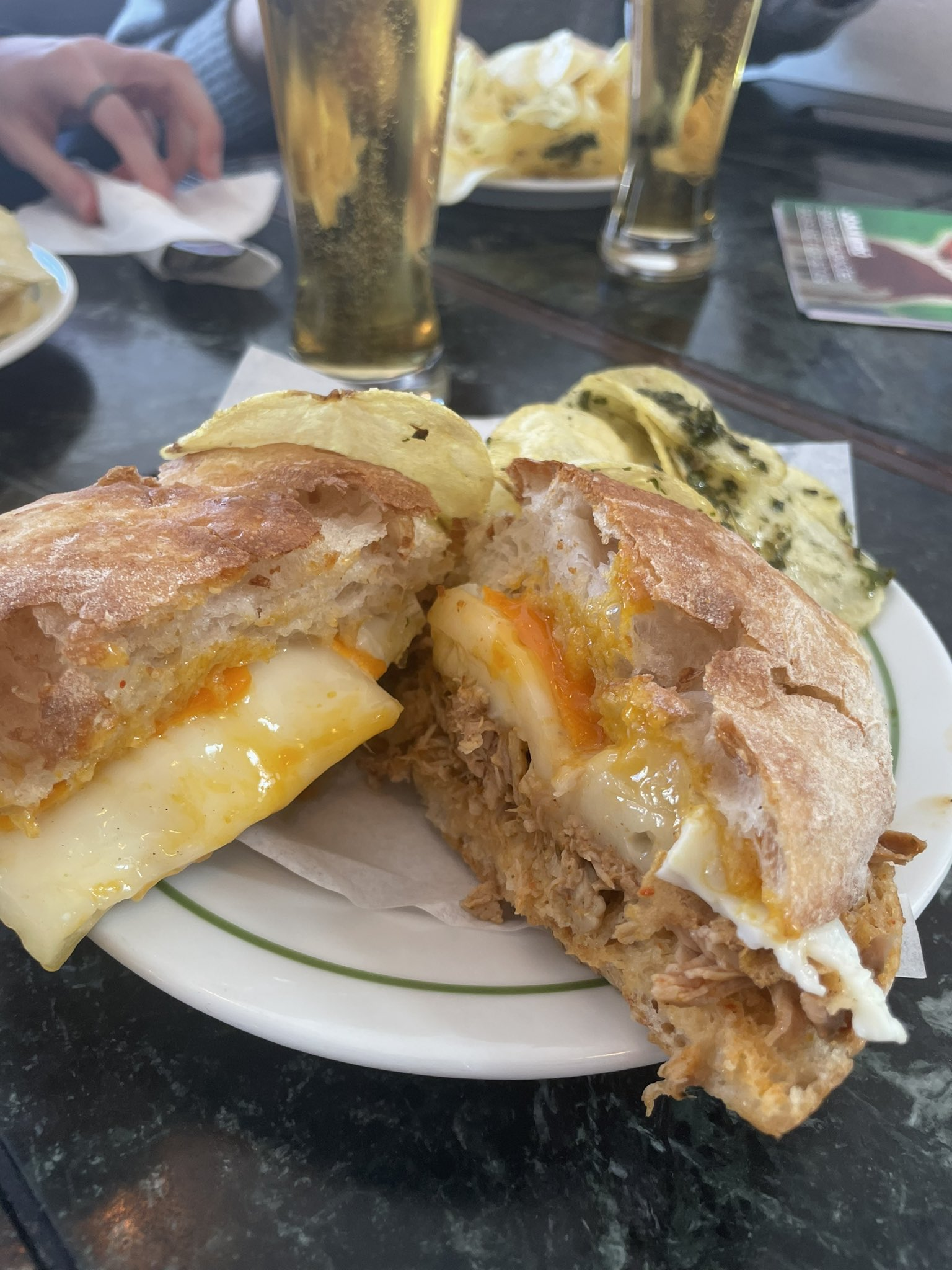
- A bifana sandwich served in Porto with pulled pork, egg, and cheese.

Bifana (lit. 'small steak') is a classic Portuguese sandwich eaten all across the country.

According to Taste Atlas, the dish may have first been created in Vendas Novas, but it is served throughout the country.

The typical ingredients are pork chops, steak, or loin, pounded thin or sliced, simmered with garlic and wine, then sandwiched inside heated bread. There are regional variations which include marinating and grilling or roasting the pork and making the sauce separately and drizzling onto the bun and/or serving with mustard, hot sauce or sauteed onions.

This dish is typically served at festivals that take place all over the country. It is typically viewed as a cheap, fast and easy meal. It is generally seen as a popular dish; McDonalds serves a version called McBifana.

In the north of Portugal, the sandwich is usually served using shredded pork and a sauce, while in the south it is a lighter sandwich which uses a pork cutlet and a light marinade.

The bifana has seen international adaptation in various European and North American cities, often in Portuguese immigrant communities. These adaptations sometimes modify traditional ingredients to cater to local tastes or ingredient availability, while still maintaining the essential characteristics of the original.
