= Szczecin paprikash =

Polish canned fish spread

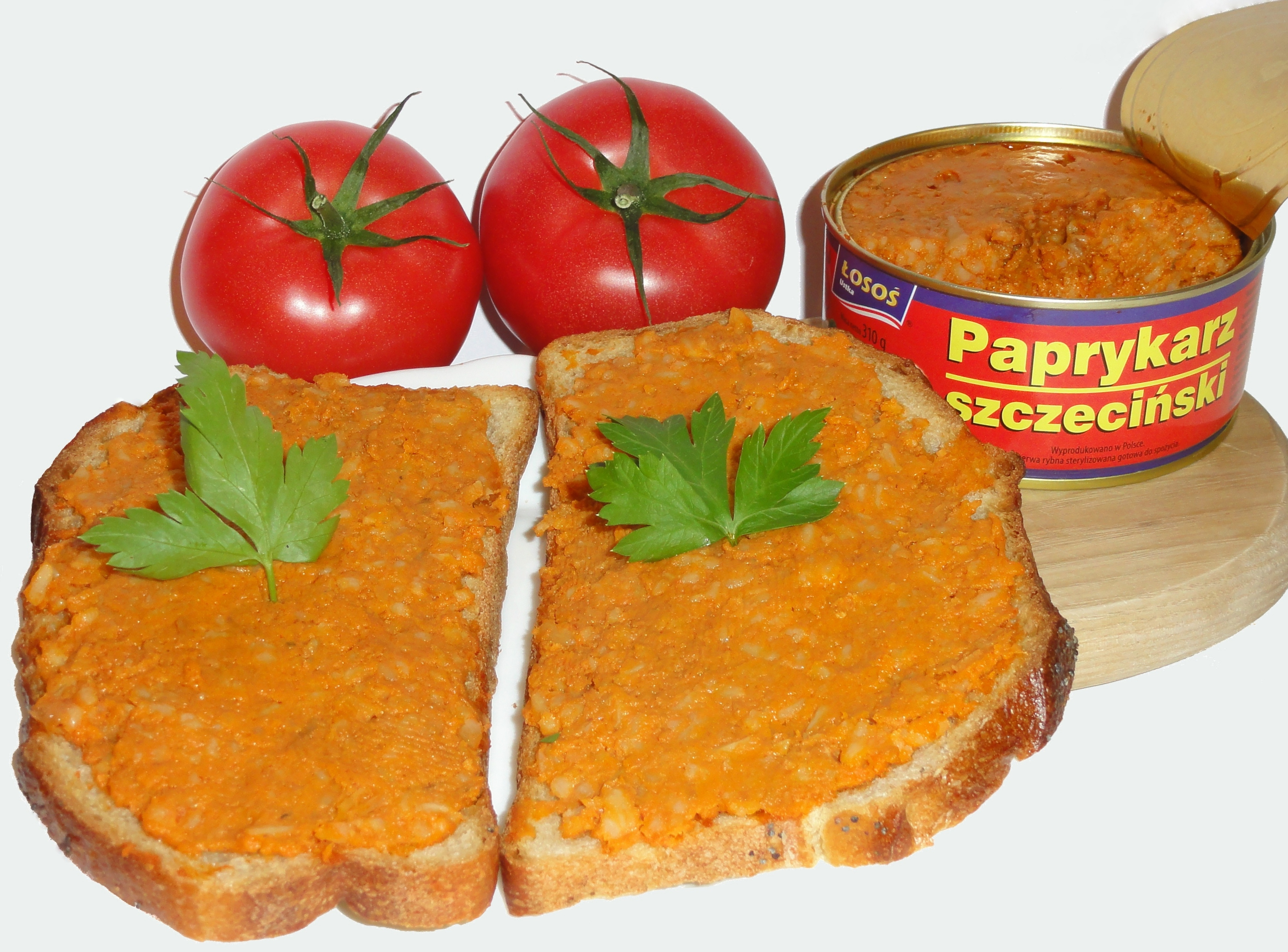
- An open can of Szczecin paprikash with some of the paste spread on bread
- Alternative names: Polish paprikash
- Type: Canned fish, spread
- Region or state: Szczecin, Poland
- Associated cuisine: Polish cuisine
- Invented: 1965–1967
- Main ingredients: Fish, rice, tomato paste, vegetable oil
- Ingredients generally used: Onion, salt, paprika

Szczecin paprikash (Polish: Paprykarz szczeciński), also known as Polish paprikash, is a Polish canned fish spread made from ground fish, rice, tomato paste and vegetable oil, seasoned with onion, salt and spices. It has the form of a reddish-brown paste with visible rice grains. The recipe, inspired by a West African dish sampled by Polish fishermen, was developed in the 1960s at a state-owned far-sea fishing and fish processing company based in the port city of Szczecin, in northwestern Poland.

== Etymology ==
The term paprykarz szczeciński is Polish. The word paprykarz refers to a spicy stew seasoned with paprika or powdered chili pepper. It derives from Hungarian paprikás, which denotes a dish of meat (beef, veal, pork or chicken) stewed with onions, paprika and sour cream, known outside of Hungary as a variant of goulash. The adjective szczeciński denotes anything coming from or related to Szczecin, a port city in West Pomerania, northwestern Poland.

== Description ==
The ingredients of paprykarz szczeciński differ by producer, but they typically include ground fish of various kinds, tomato paste, rice, onion, vegetable oil and spices. A Polish standard introduced in 1967 specifies "Nigerian pepper" (Note: Polish: pieprz nigeryjski. The meaning of this term is unclear; it may refer to Negro pepper (Xylopia aethiopica) or Nigerian peppersoup spice mix.) as the principal spice. The spread is a uniform paste of light to dark red or reddish-brown color, with visible grains of rice. The consistency is firm, ranging from slightly dry to juicy with a possible thin layer of oil on the surface. The product is sterilized and packed into steel or aluminum cans.

== History ==
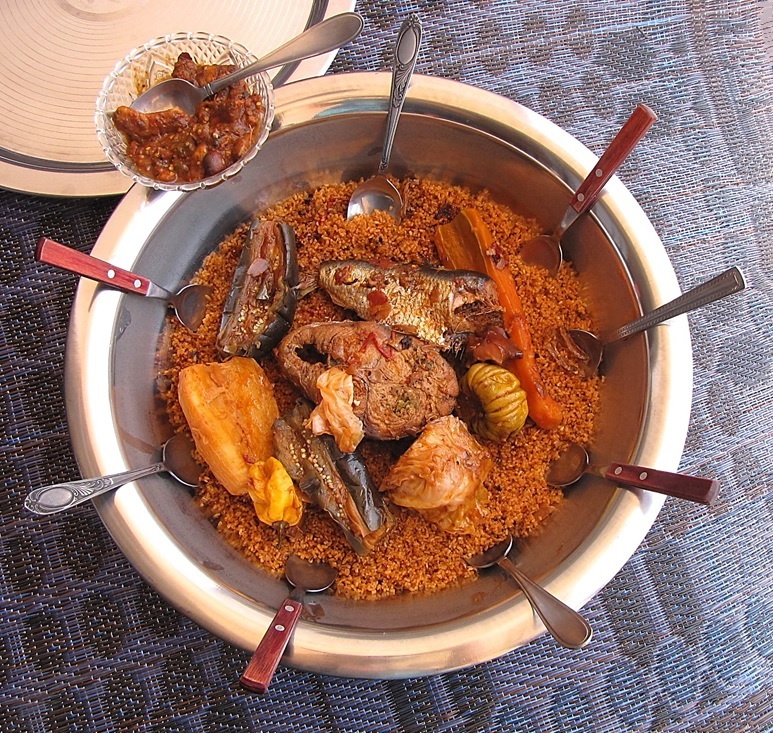
Thiéboudienne, or ceebu jën, is a Senegalese dish of rice, fish, oil, tomatoes and other vegetables.

The original recipe for paprykarz szczeciński is attributed to Wojciech Jakacki (1924–1987), deputy director and production manager at PPDiUR Gryf ("Griffin"), a state-owned far-sea fishing and fish processing company based in Szczecin. Its invention was a result of an efficiency improvement project whose goal was to find a way to use up fish scraps left over from cutting blocks of frozen fish on Gryf's fishing trawlers. The recipe was developed in Gryf laboratories between 1965 and 1967. The company's far-sea fishing activity at that time was located off the coast of West Africa. According to Bogusław Borysowicz, a co-founder and long-time employee of Gryf, the recipe was inspired by "chop-chop", (Note: The identity of "chop-chop" (spelled czop-czop in Polish sources) as a West African dish is unclear. The word chop means simply "food" or "eat" in West African Pidgin English. In terms of ingredients, paprykarz szczeciński is reminiscent of thiéboudienne, or ceebu jën, a Senegalese dish of rice, fish, oil, tomatoes and other vegetables.) a West African delicacy sampled by Gryf's fishermen in one of the local ports. The dish contained fish, rice and a hot spice called "pima". (Note: "Pima" may be a corruption of piment, the French word for chili pepper.) In 1967, Jakacki and his colleagues were issued a certificate for rationalization proposal, which, under communist intellectual property law, awarded them limited property rights to their improvement idea and allowed to put it in place. The first cans of paprykarz szczeciński were manufactured in the same year.

Originally, paprykarz szczeciński contained scraps of various kinds of fish caught off the West African coast, such as red porgy, as well as tomato pulp imported from the southern countries of the Eastern Bloc – Bulgaria, Hungary and Romania – and a spice imported from Nigeria. The fish component changed with time, as Gryf moved its fishing fleet to new locations; at various points, the paste contained Alaska pollock and blue grenadier from the Pacific Ocean (Note: The source erroneously describes Alaska pollock (Polish: mintaj) and blue grenadier (miruna) as Atlantic fish species.) or southern blue whiting from the waters around the Falkland Islands. By the end of the 1960s, the company had left the West African waters due to the Nigerian Civil War; in 1977, it moved out of the northern Pacific Ocean when Canada and the United States claimed their exclusive economic zones; and in 1982, it had to abandon the Falkland waters because of the Argentine-British war.

Due to its low price and long shelf life, the spread quickly gained popularity among Polish students, artists and hikers. At the turn of the 1980s, paprykarz szczeciński amounted to about 50 percent of Gryf's total annual canned fish output of 22,000 tonnes (24,000 short tons). The product became Poland's export hit that was sold to 32 countries, including Côte d'Ivoire, Denmark, Hungary, Japan, Jordan, Liberia, the Soviet Union, Togo and the United States. According to Gryf's internal report, the recipe was copied in Colombia, which exported its own version of the fish spread to neighboring countries.

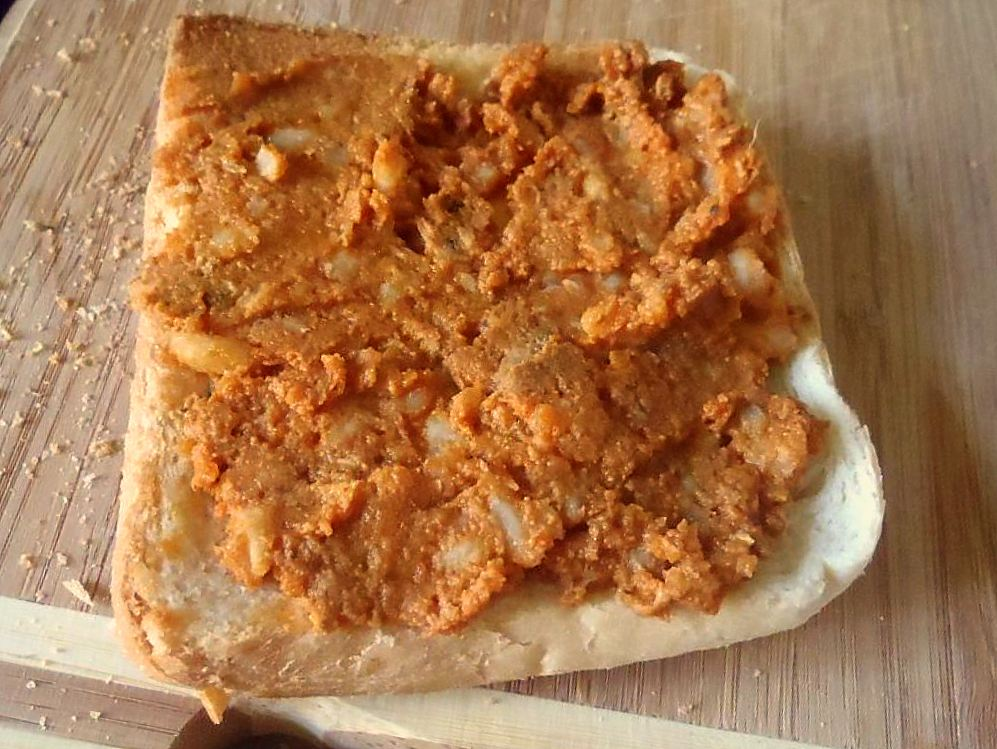
A slice of bread spread with paprykarz szczeciński

An economic downturn, which hit Poland in the 1980s, resulted in inferior quality of the product. The Nigerian spice was replaced with cheaper Hungarian paprika and the original fish content of 50 percent was reduced in favor of rice. It was common to find fragments of fins, scales and bones in the paste. A slump in the sales of paprykarz szczeciński in the mid-1980s was brought about by a public revelation that the meat of the southern blue whiting was heavily infested with Kudoa alliaria, a myxozoan parasite infecting marine fish. Consumers feared that the infected fish, rather than being recalled from the market, was ground and mixed into the paprykarz; some people took grains of rice visible in the paste for parasite cysts. During the food shortages of the time, cans of the fish paste often remained on grocery shelves along with vinegar as the only food products available.

With Poland's transition from command to market economy in the early 1990s, Polish far-sea fishing business became economically unsustainable, bringing Gryf to bankruptcy. According to Borysowicz, paprykarz szczeciński was protected by a patent, but the documents were lost during the company's liquidation. Several other Polish companies tried, without success, to obtain a patent for the same product in the 1990s and 2000s. As a result, both the recipe and the name of paprykarz szczeciński are legally unprotected, allowing various producers throughout Poland (all outside Szczecin) to manufacture their own versions of the paste, often using freshwater fish, under the same name. In 2010, the Polish Ministry of Agriculture and Rural Development placed paprykarz szczeciński on an official list of traditional products, per request from the West Pomeranian regional authorities. While this recognition itself does not grant the recipe any legal protection, it is considered a first step towards having the paste's name and geographic indication protected under European Union law.

== In culture ==
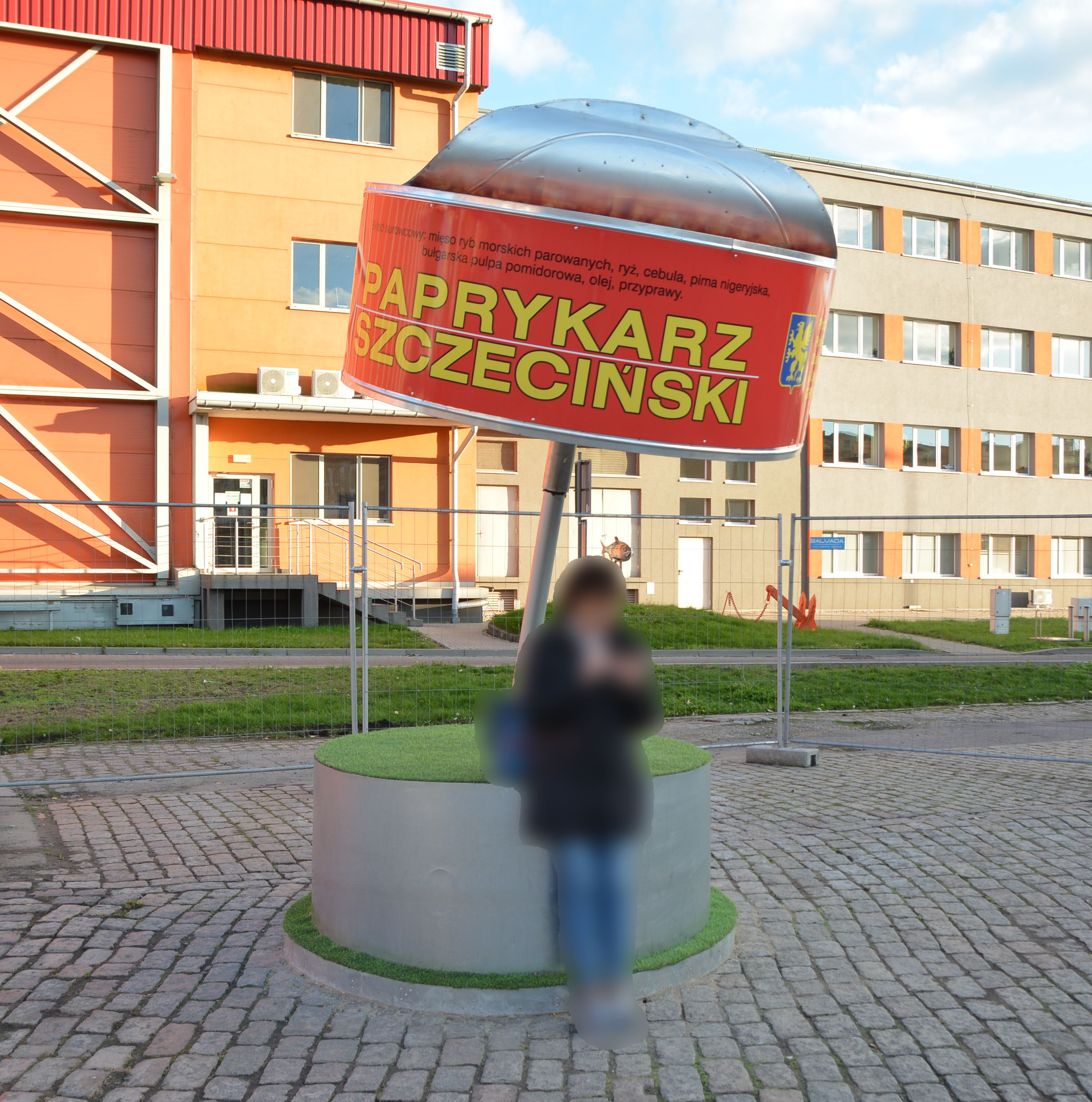
A monument to paprykarz szczeciński, in the form of an oversized can

Paprykarz szczeciński was one of the most recognizable brands in socialist Poland. Due to its popularity and association with the main city of West Pomerania, it has become a part of Szczecin's post-war local identity even though it is no longer produced in this city. The paprykarz shares this status with another local food product, a meat-filled pastry known as pasztecik szczeciński. The word Paprykarz is sometimes humorously used by people from other parts of Poland to refer to inhabitants of Szczecin and particularly to the players and fans of Pogoń Szczecin, the local soccer club.

== Sources ==
- Davidson, Alan (2014) [1999]. "Goulash". The Oxford Companion to Food. Oxford University Press. p. 358. ISBN 9780199677337.
- Duffy, Megan (2009). "Ceeb ak Jën: Deconstructing Senegal's National Plate in Search of Cultural Values". Independent Study Project (ISP) Collection (Paper 669): 8–9.
- Huber, Magnus (1999). Ghanaian Pidgin English in its West African Context: A sociohistorical and structural analysis. John Benjamins Publishing. p. 99. ISBN 978-90-272-4882-4.
- Ioffe, Olimpiad S. (1988). Soviet Civil Law. Martinus Nijhoff Publishers. p. 348. ISBN 90-247-3676-5.
- Kaczmarek, Szymon (2013). "Gdzie dobrze zjeść?" [The best places to eat]. Prestiż na Wakacje (in Polish and English). Szczecin: Wydawnictwo Prestiż. pp. 29–30.
- "Niedoszłe 50. urodziny rybackiego Gryfa" [The would-be 50th birthday of the Gryf fishing company]. Portal Morski (in Polish). 2007-04-19.
- "Paprykarz szczeciński". Lista produktów tradycyjnych (in Polish). Ministerstwo Rolnictwa i Rozwoju Wsi. 2010-12-13.
- Rudnicki, Marek (2011-01-30). "Paprykarz szczeciński był opatentowany?" [Has paprykarz szczeciński been patented?]. Głos Szczeciński (in Polish). Szczecin.
- "Wojciech Jakacki". Strona Rodziny Jakackich (in Polish).
- Zadworny, Adam (2003-11-20). "Kultowa puszka Gryfa" [Gryf's cult can]. Gazeta Wyborcza (in Polish). Szczecin.
- Zadworny, Adam (2010-08-07). "Jak zostaliśmy 'paprykarzami'" [How we've become the "Paprykarzes"]. Gazeta Wyborcza (in Polish). Szczecin.
