= Honey cake =

Honey cake may refer to:

- Lekach, Jewish honey cake
- Marlenka, Armenian honey cake produced in the Czech Republic
- Meghrov, Armenian honey cake
- Medivnyk, Ukrainian honey cake
- Medovik, Russian and Soviet honey cake
- Miodownik, Polish honey cake
- Placenta cake, Ancient Greek and Roman cake
- Medutis, Lithuania cake
