= Vyazma pryanik =

Type of Russian pryanik

- Type: pryanik
- Place of origin: Russia
- Region or state: Vyazma

Vyazma pryanik (Russian: Вяземский пряник) is a type of Russian pryanik from the city of Vyazma.

== History ==
In the 19th century, eight gingerbread factories operated in Vyazma.

In 1913, during the celebration of the 300th anniversary of the Romanov dynasty, the merchants from Vyazma gave Nicholai II a giant Vyazma pryanik weighing 16 kilograms (one pood).

== In literature ==
The pryanik is mentioned in The History of a Town by Saltykov-Shchedrin, Chekhov's The Steppe and other works of Russian writers. Alexander Pushkin said: "Moscow is famous for its brides, like Vyazma for its pryaniks".

== See also ==
- Tula pryanik
