= Basler Läckerli =

Swiss spiced biscuit

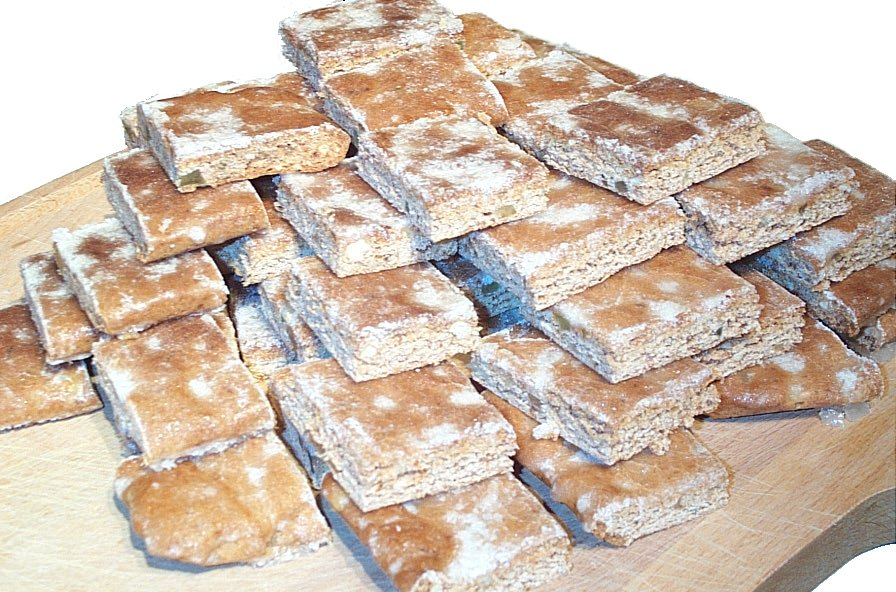
- Alternative names: Leckerli, Läggerli
- Type: Biscuit
- Place of origin: Switzerland
- Region or state: Basel
- Main ingredients: Honey, hazelnuts, almonds, candied peel, Kirsch

The Basler Läckerli (also Leckerli or Läggerli, lecker meaning "delicious" in German and -li being a diminutive suffix) is a traditional hard spice biscuit originating from Basel, Switzerland. It is made of honey, hazelnuts, almonds, candied peel, and Kirsch. After baking in a thin layer, the still hot dough is topped with a sugar glaze and cut into rectangular pieces.

Basler Läckerli were originally created by local spice merchants over 700 years ago and are available year-round.

== Recipe ==
Basler Läckerli are made primarily from wheat flour, honey, candied fruit (orange peel, lemon peel) and nuts (hazelnuts, almonds). The dough is rolled out flat, baked, then brushed over with a sugar glaze and cut into rectangular pieces (the Läckerli) while still warm.

== History ==
When the trade in oriental spices reached Europe in the 11th century, the wealthy monasteries were the first to use them to flavor honey cakes. This custom gradually spread to the towns, starting the gingerbread craft in Switzerland in the 15th century. From the 17th century, the first different gingerbread and treat recipes appeared in cookbooks. "Läckerli" or "Läckerle" are or were widespread in southern Germany and German-speaking Switzerland. The word is first attested from Augsburg in 1591 («111 Leckherle at 4 Kreuzer and 324 other Leckherle at 3 Kreuzer»); the first Swiss Läckerli recipe can be found in the 1621 handbook of Abraham Schneuwly, a doctor in Bern («Frauw Anna Von Hallweil to make little treats»). Other early Läckerli recipes are attested from St. Gallen (1640), Zofingen (1677), Schaffhausen (1684), Graubünden (1689) and Zurich (end of the 17th century). In Basel, the Läckerli appear for the first time in a statement by the gardeners' guild of October 10, 1711, where "3 Läckerlin leaves" are mentioned; in previous the recipe books the term gingerbread was used.

The widespread legend that the Basler Läckerli were created for the members of the Council of Basel in 1431 is unlikely to be correct, since the customs and department store records of the Basel-Stadt State Archives do not indicate that the essential ingredients for the Basler Läckerli were available on the market in Basel in the 15th century.

== Word origin ==
The noun Läggerli is probably derived from the verb lägge ("to lick") and originally meant "sweets" or "confectionery"; compare the words Schläckwaar ("lick ware") and Schläckzüüg ("lick thing") for sweets in general.

== Manufacturers ==
Läckerli are made by various producers in Switzerland, both industrially (including by Jowa AG in Gossau for Migros) and by hand, especially by numerous Basel bakeries.

Specialists in Läckerli production are:

- Läckerli Huus, the market leader, was founded in 1904 on Breisacherstrasse in Basel, with production in Münchenstein from 1906 to 2014, and in Frenkendorf since then. Läckerli Huus produces a wide range of Läckerli and chocolate products in their factory and operates stores throughout Switzerland.
- Jakob's Basler Leckerly (actually Karl Jakob Nachf. von JJ Steiger sel. Erben AG) was founded in 1753 in Basel and is the oldest manufacturer, according to their own statements. This manufacturer's Läckerli are handmade and are about twice as thick as Läckerli from other manufacturers.

== See also ==
- Culinary Heritage of Switzerland
- Duvshaniot
