= Miodownik =

Polish honey-flavoured layer cake

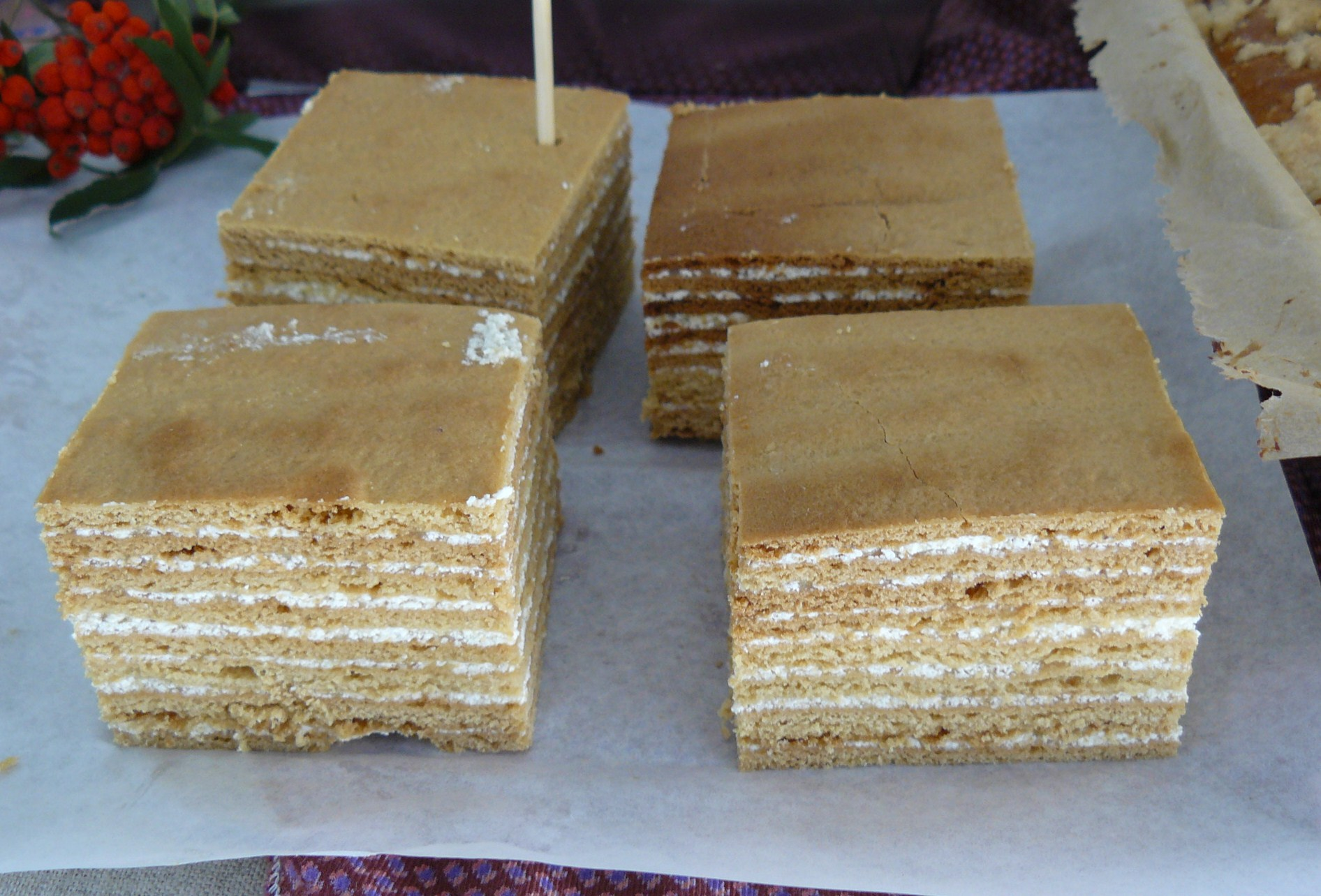
- Miodownik served in Poznań
- Alternative names: Stefanka, chonek łejkech
- Type: Cake
- Course: Dessert
- Place of origin: Galicia (Southeastern Poland) and Central Poland
- Serving temperature: Cold
- Main ingredients: Honey

In Polish cuisine, miodownik (Polish: [mjɔˈdɔvɲik], from miód 'honey'; German: Honigkuchen [ˈhoːnɪçˌkuːxn̩]) or stefanka is a type of layer cake flavoured with honey, similar to cakes in other Slavic cuisines such as the Russian medovik and Czech medovnik. It is broadly considered a type of piernik, meaning a sweet and/or spiced confectionery good. The recipe for miodownik originates from Galicia (Southeastern Poland) and Central Poland.

The cake is prepared similarly to sponge cake, which is topped with honey that is melted and then cooled down along with other sugary ingredients. Once the mass of prepared dough is poured onto a baking sheet, it is baked at 200 °C (392 °F) for about 40 minutes.

== See also ==
- List of Polish dishes
- Medivnyk – Ukrainian dessert
- Medovik – Russian/Ukrainian layer cake
