= Liver cake =

Savoury layer cake of European origin

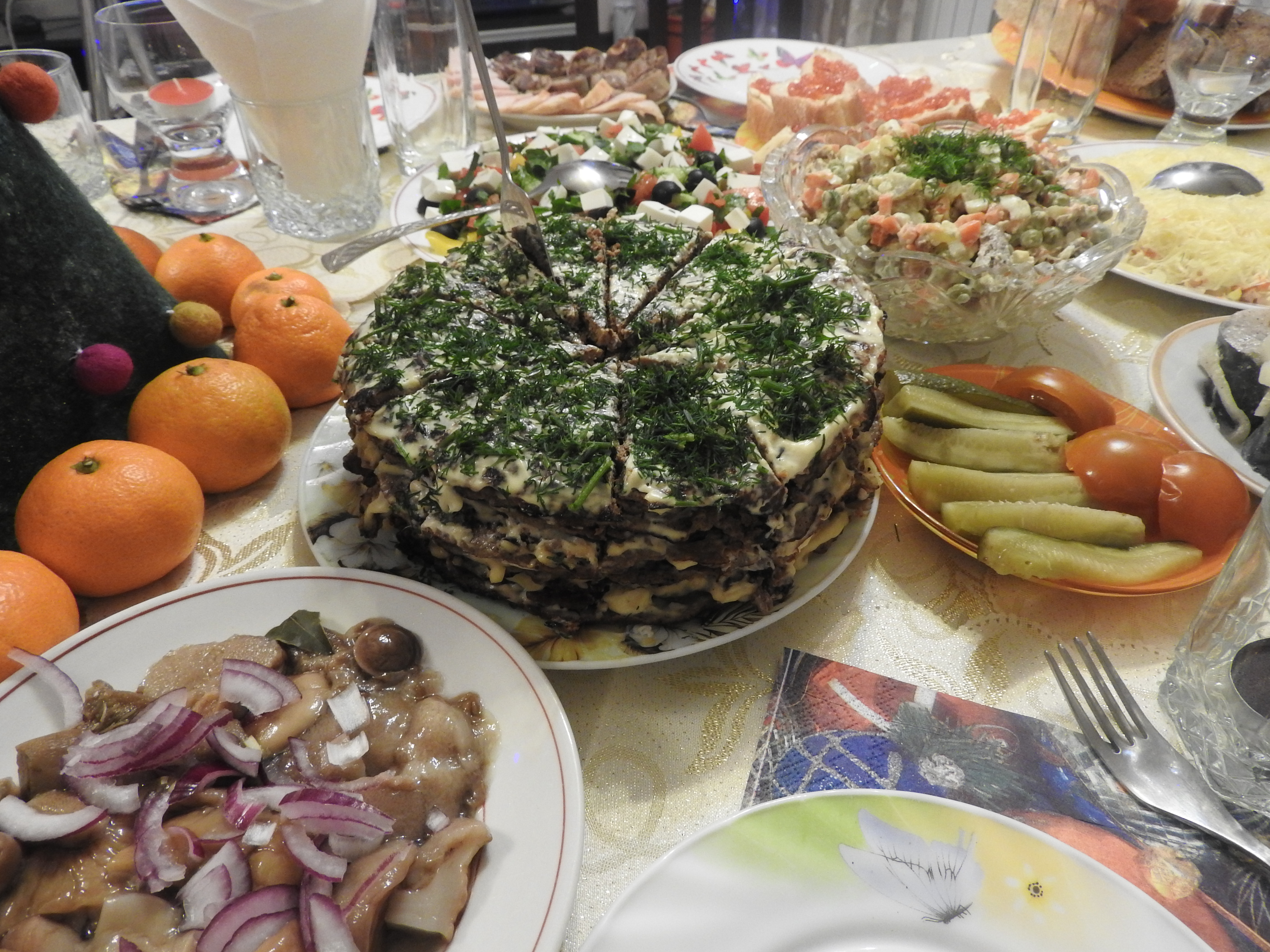
- Type: Layer cake
- Main ingredients: Liver; mayonnaise; flour
- Variations: Carrot; cream cheese; egg; garlic; herbs; onion

External images
- Liver cake topped with herbs
- Liver cake topped with carrots

Liver cake (Ukrainian: печінковий торт; Russian: торт печеночный) is a savoury layer cake found in the cuisines of Ukraine, Russia, and Hungary. Chicken liver is often used so that the cake will taste light and tender, although beef or pork liver are also viable options. The liver is mixed in the batter of the cake, rather than served as the filling of the cake. (Note: There are cakes other than liver cake in which liver is used but not mixed in the batter; one unusual version of medovik, a layered honey cake, uses chicken liver pâté between the layers of cake.) Cream cheese or mayonnaise is spread between the layers of liver. Toppings may include carrots, grated eggs, herbs, or onions.

The cake can be served during various family celebrations, including birthdays or holidays such as Maslenitsa, an Eastern Slavic holiday around the end of winter.
