= Lekach =

Jewish cake

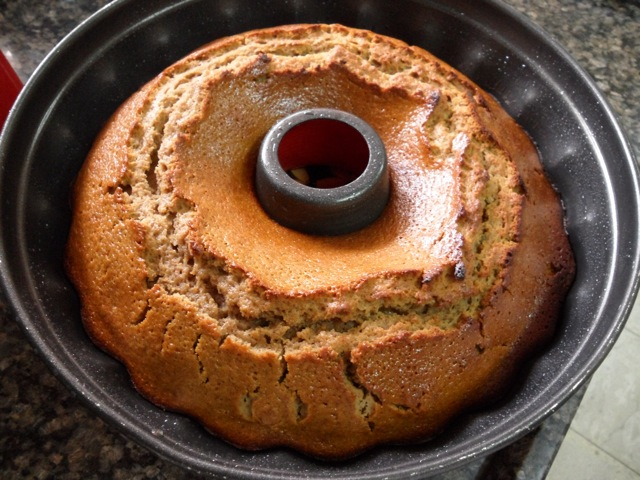
- Alternative names: Ugat Dvash, Honey Cake
- Type: Cake
- Course: Dessert
- Place of origin: Israel, Jewish Diaspora
- Region or state: Ashkenazi Communities of Eastern Europe
- Created by: Ashkenazi Jews
- Serving temperature: Room temperature
- Main ingredients: Rye flour, honey, spices, baking powder

Lekach is a honey-sweetened cake made by Jews, especially for the Jewish holiday of Rosh Hashanah. Known in Hebrew as ugat dvash (עוּגַת דְּבַשׁ, lit. 'honey cake'), it is mainly eaten in Israel by Israeli Jews and Jewish people all over the world who know it by its Yiddish name, lekach (לעקעך), phono-semantically matched in Hebrew as [ugat] lekakh ([עוּגַת] לֶקַח, lit. 'lesson cake') influenced by the Biblical association of teaching with honey. It is traditionally eaten at Rosh Hashanah in hopes of ensuring a sweet New Year. It is also customary to ask for and receive a honey cake on Erev Yom Kippur among Chabad Jews.

== History ==
Various sorts of cakes sweetened with honey have been known since ancient times, in Egypt, Rome, and the Middle East. Arabs brought these traditions to Sicily and Moorish Spain. In the 11th century, a type of strongly spiced thick cake made from breadcrumbs and honey, resembling panforte, became popular in Italy. Italian Jews brought some of these styles to Western and Central Europe. The earliest known record in a Jewish source of a cake called lekach, from the Middle High German lecke, 'to lick', was in the Medieval ages in Sefer ha-Rokeach by Eleazar ben Judah of Worms, Germany.

Many Ashkenazi versions by the 13th century were influenced by or based on Lebkuchen or Honigkuchen (honey cake) recipes found in Germany. Such heavily spiced cakes, analogous to the English gingerbread, became popular all over medieval Europe in communities of all religions, especially during important feasts and holidays. Lekach has changed drastically over the centuries, such that its current forms bear little resemblance to its ancestors. There are now many variations, ranging from dark and heavy to lighter more delicate versions, though in general it is never frosted. Lekach was brought to the Land of Israel by Ashkenazi immigrants.

== Overview ==
A traditional honey cake from the Jewish community of Austria contains an equal weight of white rye flour and dark honey, strong Austrian coffee instead of water, cloves, cinnamon, allspice, and golden raisins in the loaf, with slivered almonds on top of the loaf. It also has a fair number of eggs, vegetable oil (usually corn oil), salt, and baking powder.

== Variations ==
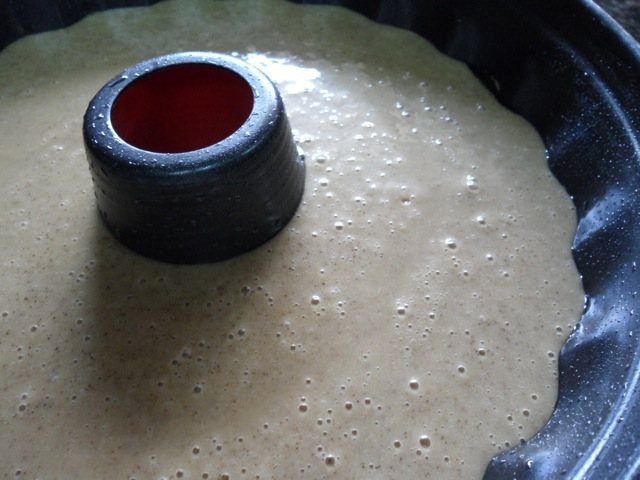
Lekach prior to baking

Recipes vary widely. Lekach is usually a dense, loaf-shaped cake, but some versions are similar to sponge cake or pound cake, with the addition of honey and spices, sometimes with coffee or tea for coloring. Other versions are more like gingerbread, pain d'épices, or lebkuchen.

== See also ==
- Jewish cuisine
- Jewish apple cake
