= Jakob's Basler Leckerly =

Swiss food company

Karl Jakob Nachf. von J.J. Steiger sel. Erben AG
- Traded as: Public limited company
- Industry: Baked goods
- Founded: 1753
- Headquarters: Basel, Switzerland
- Key people: Charlotte Kuster, Andreas Custer
- Number of employees: approx. 20
- Website: www.baslerleckerly.ch

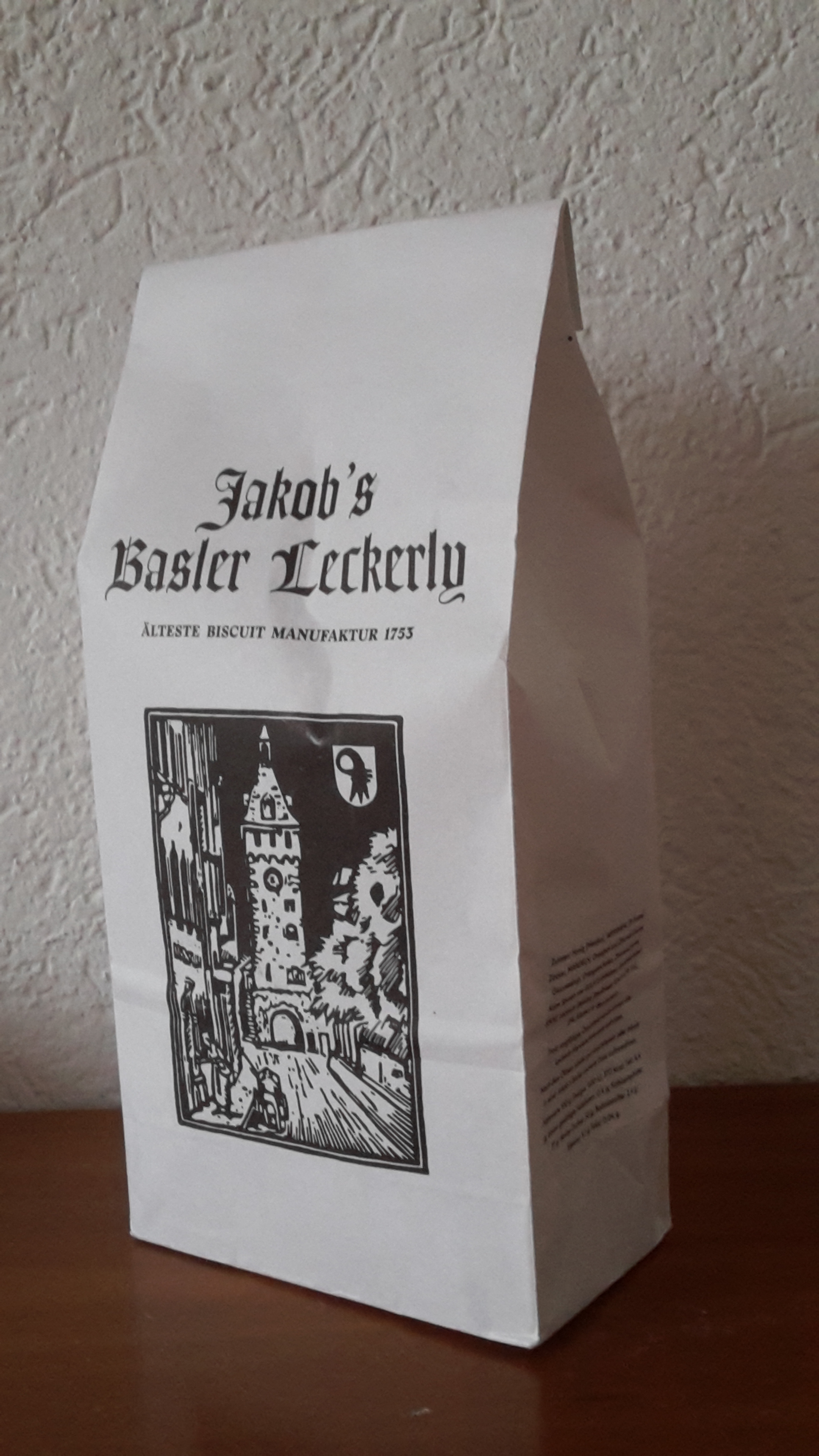
Jakob's Basler Leckerly

Jakob's Basler Leckerly (actual name Karl Jakob Nachf. von J.J. Steiger sel. Erben AG) is a family business in Basel and the oldest still existing biscuit manufacturer in Switzerland, as well as one of the 20 oldest still existing companies in Switzerland.

== History ==
The company was first mentioned in the 17th century. The company Karl Jakob Nachf. by J.J. Steiger sel. Erben AG or Jakob's Basler Leckerly for short was founded in 1753 as the Steiger'sches Kaffeehaus (Steiger'sches Coffeehouse) on Schneidergasse 20.

In 1783, the mayor and council of Basel confirmed that the "loyal dear citizen" J.J. Steiger-Bruckner (1736–1813) could obtain permission to run a coffee house (with a production for Basler Läckerli) on Schneidergasse 20. The company then developed into a chocolatier and Läckerli manufacturer. A new Läckerli oven was built in 1819.

The desire to travel gained momentum in the mid-19th century. Läckerli were shipped worldwide and an export hit. Jakob's Basler Leckerly were the most important Läckerli manufactory in Basel at the time. In the first edition of the Swiss Baedeker travel guide from 1844, the Steiger Basler Leckerly were recommended as a souvenir when visiting Basel. At the trade exhibition that took place in 1877, the Steiger Basler Leckerly won the Basel honorary award for the extraordinary product quality.

In 1895 the widow Lydia Braun Schuhmacher, an heiress to the Steiger family, sold the company to Wilhelm Jakob-Kemmler (1852–1909). The venture was rebranded into J.J. Steiger sel. Heirs, W. Jakob-Kemmler, Nachfolger. The Jakob family made the business flourish over two generations until the Second World War.

In 1909, Wilhelm Jakob handed the company over to his son Karl Jakob (1877–1941). The company was now called Karl Jakob Nachf. von J.J. Steiger sel. Erben. In 1938 the stock corporation Karl Jakob Nachf. von J.J. Steiger sel. Erben AG was founded. In everyday business, however, only the name Jakob's Basler Leckerly is used. After the death of Karl Jakob in 1942, Heinrich Spillmann (1911–1979) continued to run the company until 1973. Spillmann was followed by Hans Strobel (1932-2006) and his partner Inge Kiefer.

In 2017, the Andreas and Charlotte Kuster family from Basel took over the company and continued to run it as a family business. Despite the corona pandemic, it was possible to open a branch in Basel in 2020 and to increase the number of employees to 20 by the year 2022.

== Significant products ==
The company still produces Läckerli today using recipes that have been handed down for generations from the 18th and 19th centuries. For example, the recipe for Jakob's honey treat dates back to the 18th century and goes back to J.J. Steiger (1736–1813). The classic Jakob's Basler Leckerly is a recipe from the 19th century. Jakob's Schoggi Leckerly was added in the 20th century. In the 21st century, spring treats were added to the recipes. In addition, since 2018, two of the four varieties have also been offered in a kosher version.

== Awards ==
In 2018, Jakob's Basler Leckerly won the Northwest Switzerland Young Entrepreneurs' Prize, worth CHF 10,000. The company prevailed against around 30 competitors.

In 2020, the Lällenkönig tin from Jakob's Basler Leckerly was awarded the audience prize at the Swiss Packaging Awards.

Jakob's Basler Leckerly was honored in the "Tradition" category at the Basel Gourmet Week 2021.
