= Läckerli Huus =

Swiss confectionery manufacturer

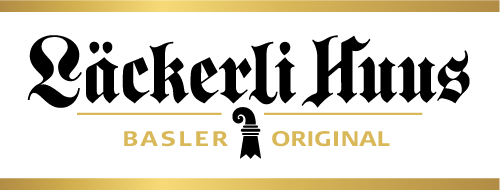

Läckerli Huus is a Swiss manufacturer of confectionery and baked goods based in Frenkendorf in the canton of Basel-Landschaft.

== History ==
The company specialized in the production of Basler Läckerli and a number of other Basel delicacies.

The company then began shipping the products to customers before opening their first store in 1950. Four years later, Läckerli Huus was represented with a stall at the Mustermesse Basel for the first time. In the early 1970s, Läckerli Huus moved into its current domicile at Gerbergasse 57/Falknerstrasse 34.

Miriam Blocher, daughter of Christoph Blocher and a trained food engineer and entrepreneur, took over the Dalasta group, to which Läckerli Huus also belongs, at the beginning of 2007.

The company has been based in Frenkendorf since 2014, where the production facilities, warehouse and offices are located. The architecture of the building in Frenkendorf represents the long tradition of biscuit tins, as well as the gold tones often used for them. The trademark rights of the Cola-Fröschli, which were developed in Läckerli Huus in 1938, were sold to Egli Import AG in Effretikon in 2015.
