= Duvshaniot =

Honey cookies made for Jewish holidays

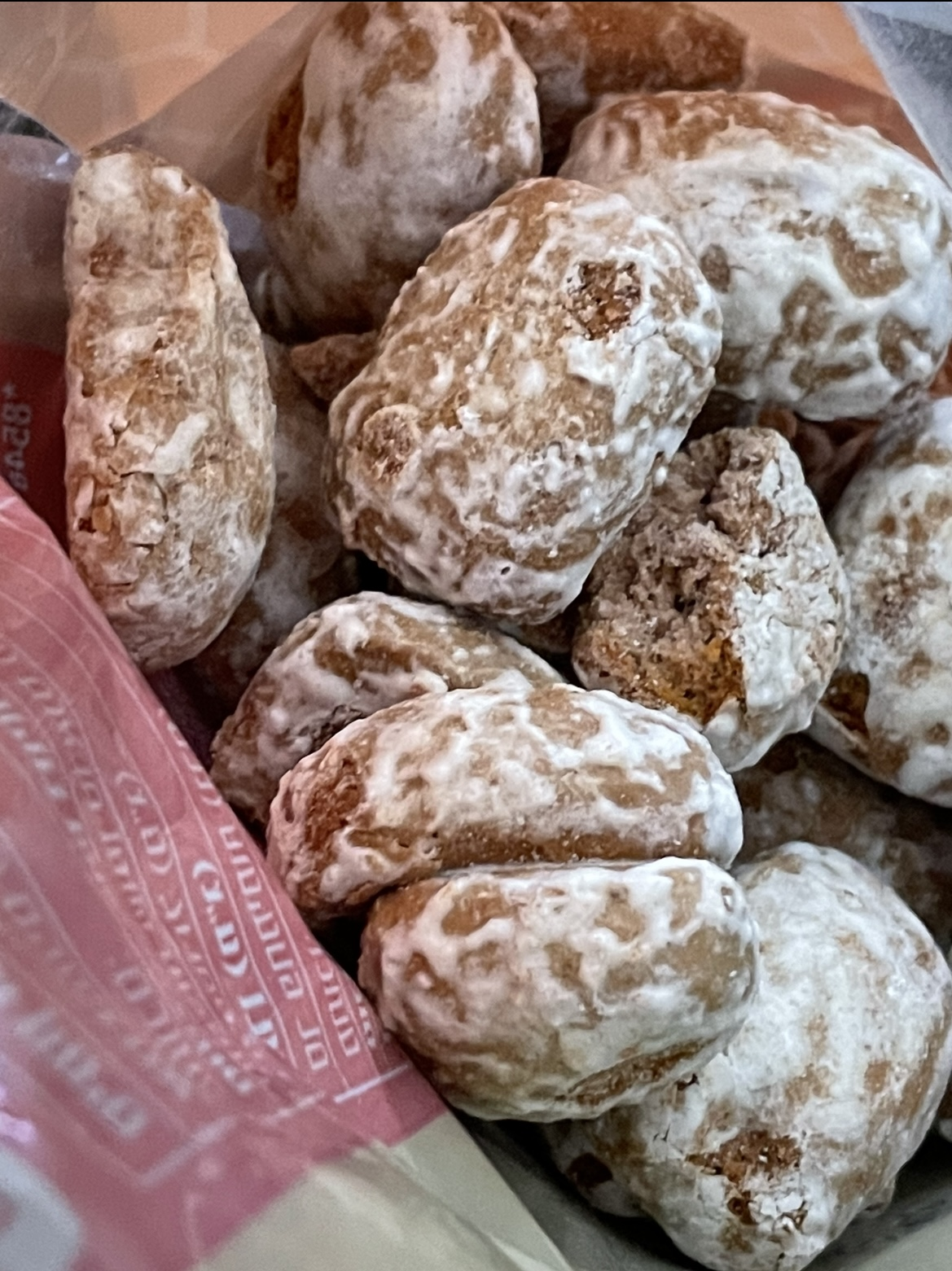
Duvshaniot

Duvshaniot (Hebrew: דובשניות), also known as honey buttons, is a popular Israeli cookie made with honey and spices that is traditionally made to celebrate Rosh Hashanah and the High Holidays.

== Overview ==
Duvshaniot are a small, round medium brown-colored cookie. They are made with a variety of spices such as cinnamon, nutmeg, cardamom, or baharat. They get their English name, honey buttons, from the use of honey or silan in these cookies. This gives them their signature, spiced honey flavor. Duvshaniot are commonly sold in glazed, topped with fondant, or plain, unglazed varieties.

Duvshaniot are associated with the celebration of the Jewish holiday Rosh Hashanah as part of the tradition of consuming honey to usher in a "sweet new year". It is a common custom in Israel for families and friends to send each other gift baskets containing biscuits and sweets such as duvshaniot.

Duvshaniot are commonly available from bakeries across Israel during the High Holiday season. Packaged varieties made by companies such as Osem are sold at grocery and convenience stores in Israel, and are also exported abroad to countries such as the United States.

== In other cultures ==
Other types of cookies and biscuits similar to duvshaniot are found in Europe, including Turtă dulce cu miere (gingerbread with honey) from Romania and Basler Läckerli from Switzerland.
