= Jewish apple cake =

Cake made with apples traditional to Ashkenazi Jewish cuisine

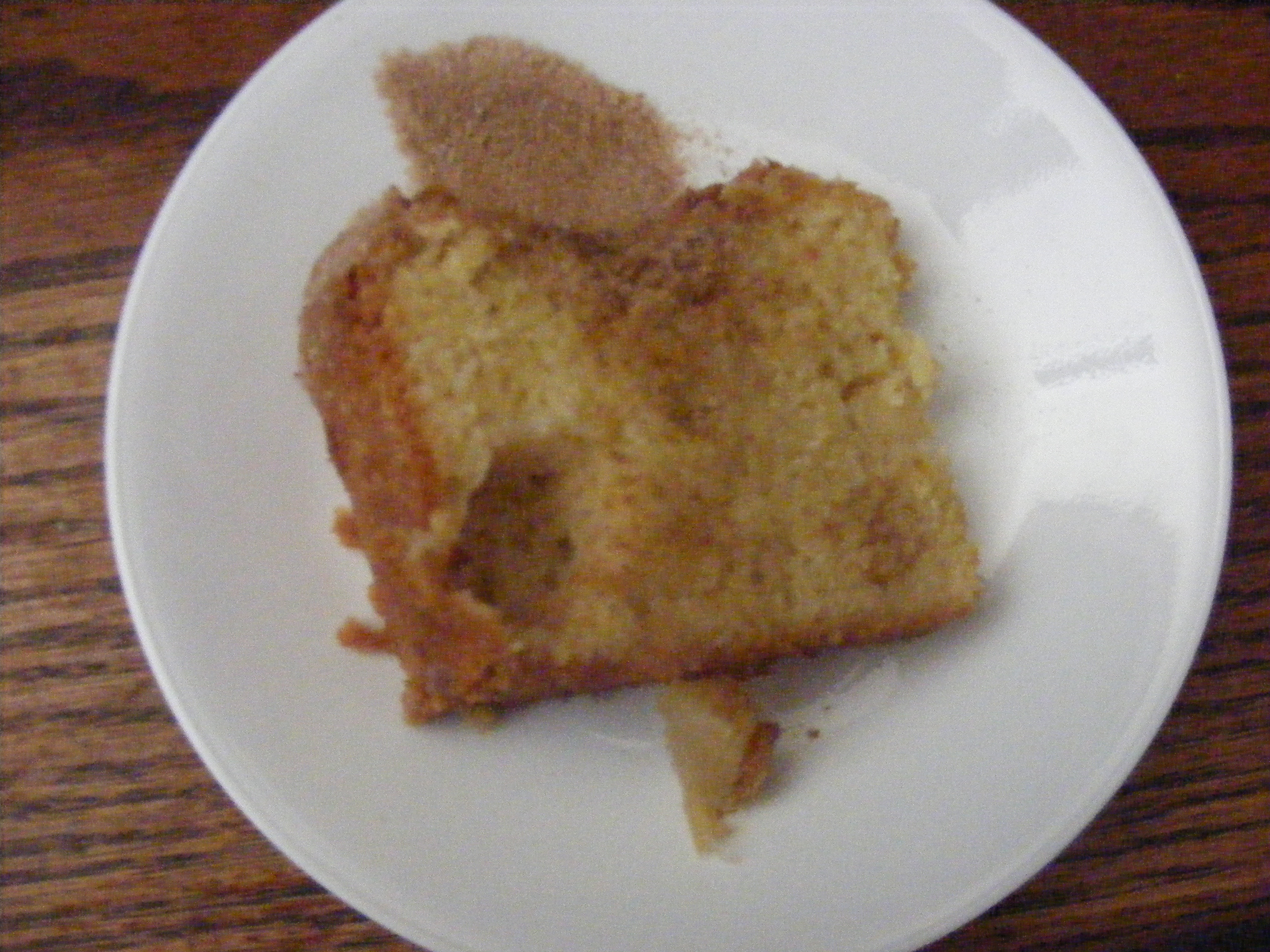
- Slice of Jewish apple cake
- Type: Cake
- Place of origin: Poland
- Region or state: Pennsylvania, United States
- Main ingredients: Apples

Jewish apple cake is a dense cake made with apples which originated in Poland, but is now sold mostly in the U.S. state of Pennsylvania. Apples are common in Jewish Ashkenazi cooking and are a part of the traditional food served during the Jewish holiday of Rosh Hashanah (the Jewish New Year). Jewish apple cake is traditionally made without dairy products, and may, therefore, be eaten with meals containing meat, in accordance with Jewish dietary laws of kashrut, which forbid the mixing of meat and milk products in the same meal. The use of oil instead of butter also makes this cake a popular choice during Hanukkah, when it is traditional to eat fried or oily foods in remembrance of the miracle of the oil.
