= Tula pryanik =

Type of Russian sweet baked good

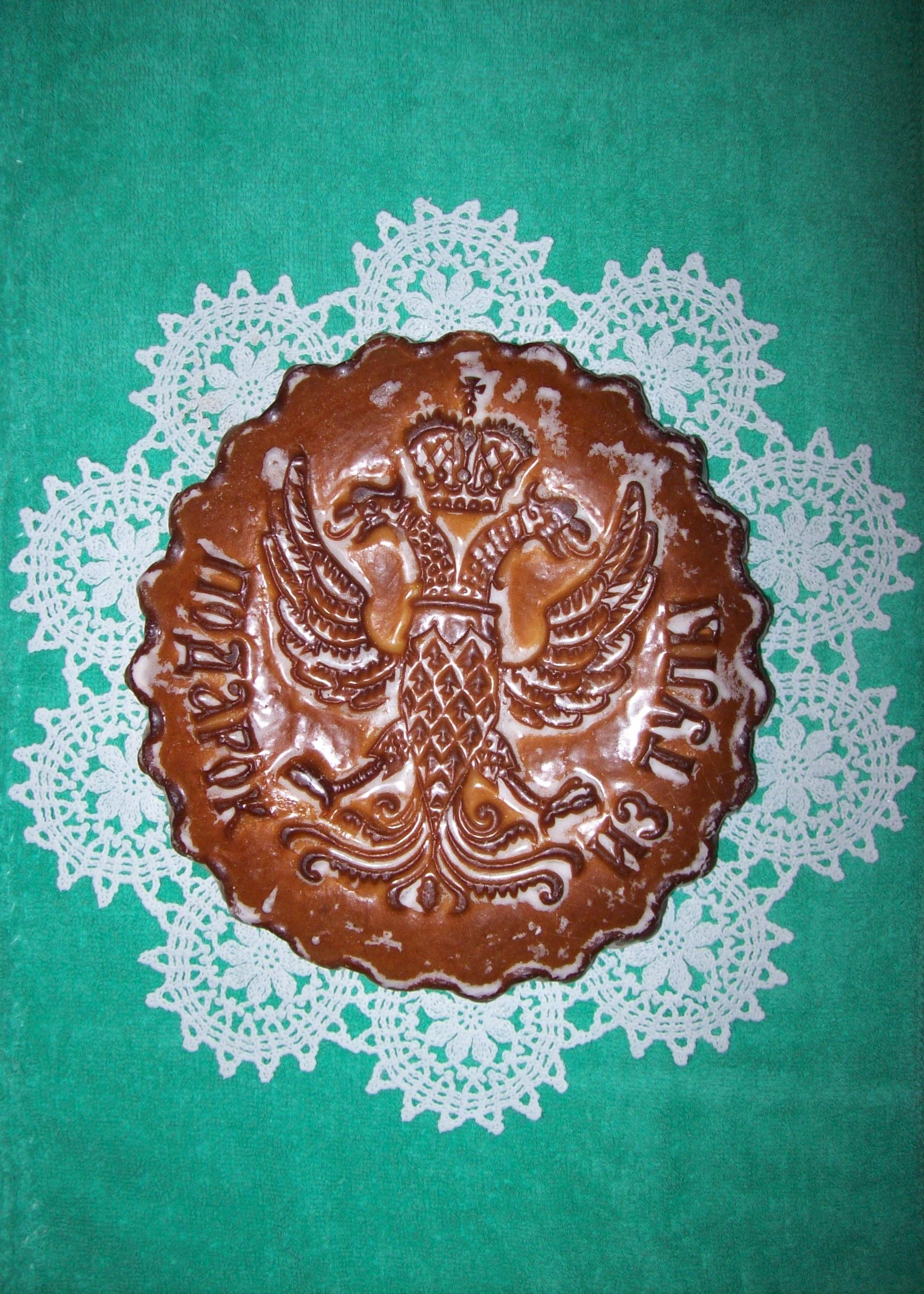
- A Tula pryanik with the Coat of Arms of Russia
- Type: pryanik
- Place of origin: Russia
- Region or state: Tula
- Main ingredients: flour, honey, jam or condensed milk filling (optional)

Tula pryanik (Russian: тульский пряник, tulskiy pryanik) is a famous type of imprinted Russian pryanik from the city of Tula. Usually, Tula pryanik looks like a rectangular tile or a flat figure. Making stamped pryanik is considered an art form. The imprints could include different patterns, symbols, images of the Tula Kremlin, names, congratulations.

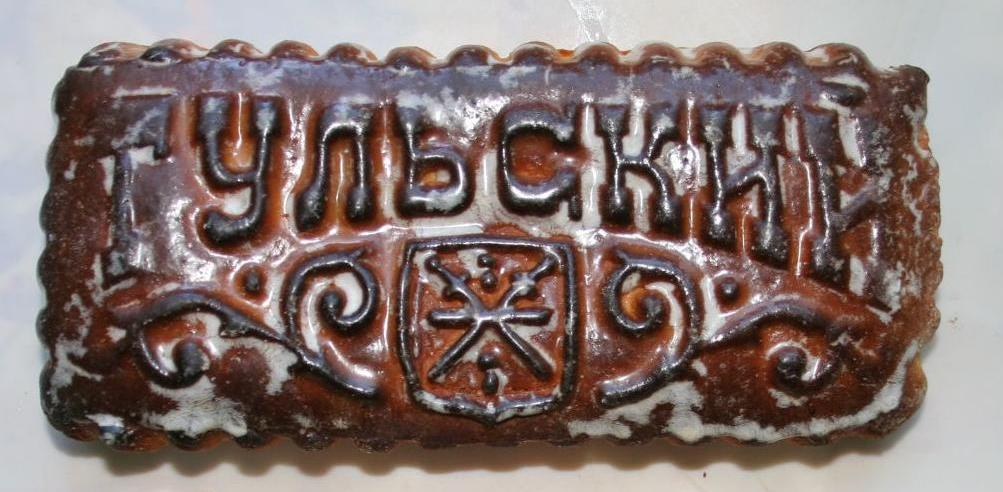
A Tula pryanik imprinted with the caption Tulsky (the adjective form of Tula) and the city's coat of arms

The cooking of the Tula pryanik starts with preparation of the dough. The dough is made from rye flour, honey, eggs, water and spices. Next the dough is cut into pieces and rolled out. Each piece is placed on a special pryanik board with a carved pattern to give the dough its intended form. The first layer of the dough is covered with a second one with a filling in between. To make the two layers stay in place the edges are pressed together. Then the cake is turned over so that the stamped image is on top and the surface is glazed with sugar syrup. The syrup covers the picture to make it more visible after baking. Historically, each carved board is used to create just one design for pryanik. A new board is made specifically for each design. In the past, pryanik boards were made by craftsmen and nowadays, new designs are created mostly by professional artists.

Modern Tula pryaniki typically have a jam or condensed milk filling, while the traditional ingredient in the dough is honey which is sometimes replaced with sugar.

Pryaniki have been made in Tula since the 17th century. The first mention of Tula pryanik is in the Tula census book of 1685. Today, Tula pryaniki are made at the confectionery factories of Staraya Tula (Russian for "Old Tula") and Yasnaya Polyana and by several smaller companies.

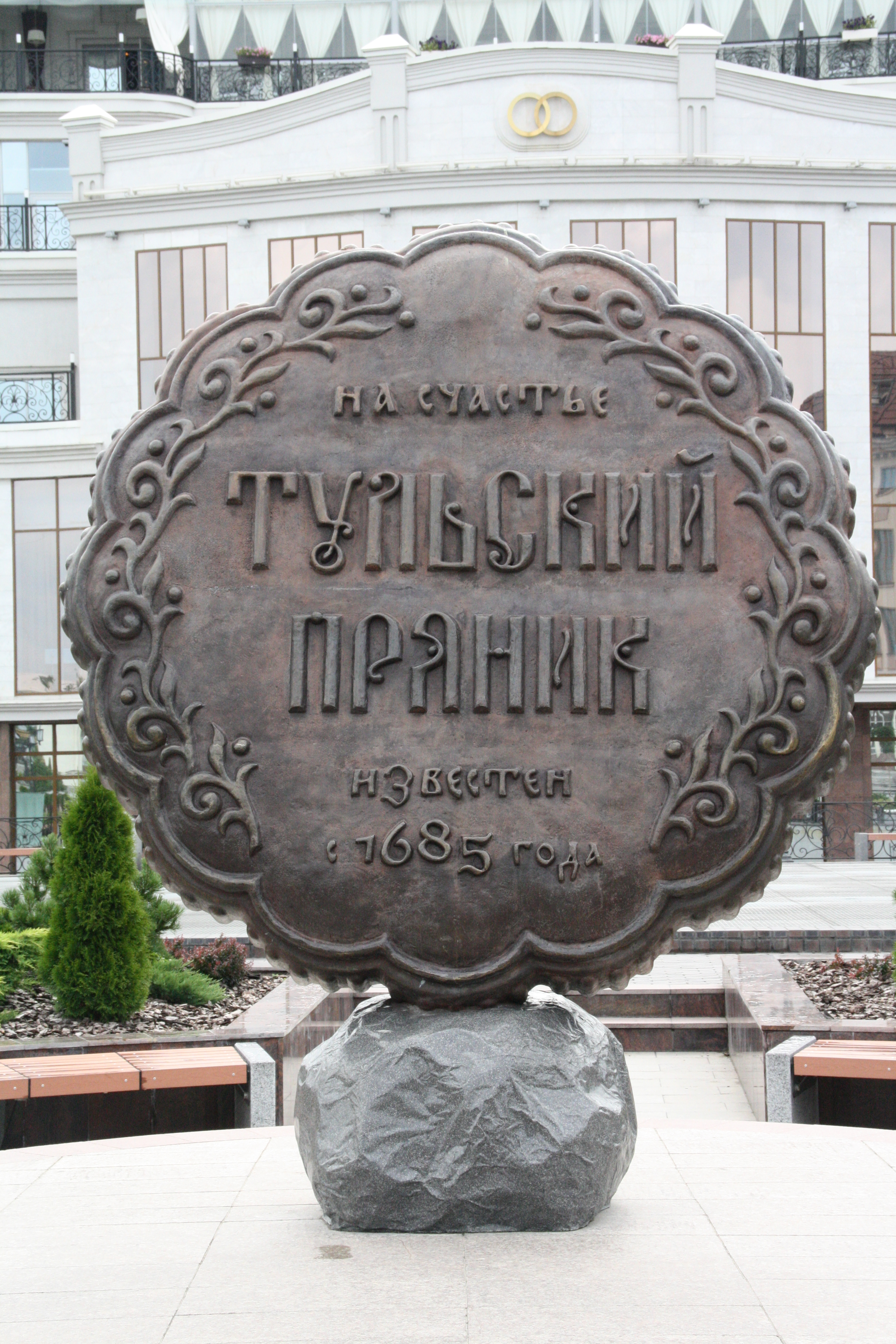
Tula pryanik monument

In 1996, Tula opened a museum dedicated to its pryaniki.

== See also ==
- Vyazma pryanik
