= Medivnyk =

Ukrainian dessert

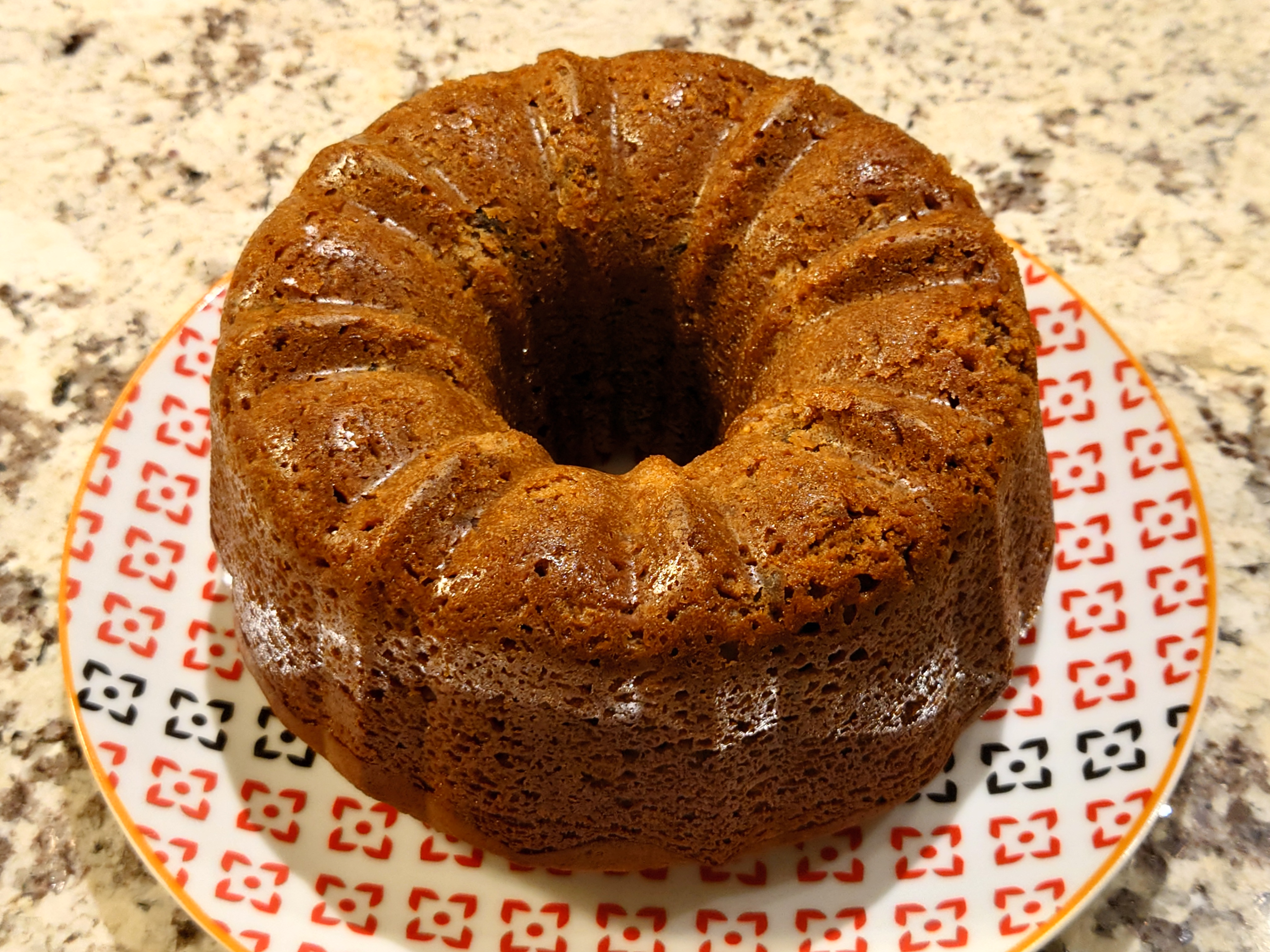
- Homemade medivnyk
- Alternative names: Medovyk
- Type: Cake
- Course: Dessert
- Place of origin: Ukraine
- Region or state: Galicia
- Serving temperature: Ambient
- Main ingredients: Buckwheat honey, flour, brown sugar, eggs, orange rind

Medivnyk or medovyk (Ukrainian: медівник) іs a Ukrainian honey cake.

According to food writer Marianna Dushar, medivnyk is a fundamental dessert of Lviv regional cuisine. Polish-Ukrainian food writer Wiktoria Popin classifies medivnyk as a keks (a type of fruitcake). Medivnyk typically includes spices, nuts and raisins. Buckwheat honey is preferred to give the cake its distinctive taste.

Apart from the spongy cake, medivnyk in Ukrainian can also mean prianyk or pernik, a hard honey cookie.

The village of Velykyi Bychkiv, located in the Rakhiv Raion, Zakarpattia Oblast, has a peculiar wedding custom. Instead of baking a traditional wedding korovai, they make an "embroidered" honey cake called medivnyk. This traditional bread is intricately decorated with ornaments resembling Hutsul embroidered shirts.

== See also ==
- Miodownik
- Medovik
