= Pryanik =

Traditional Eastern European cake

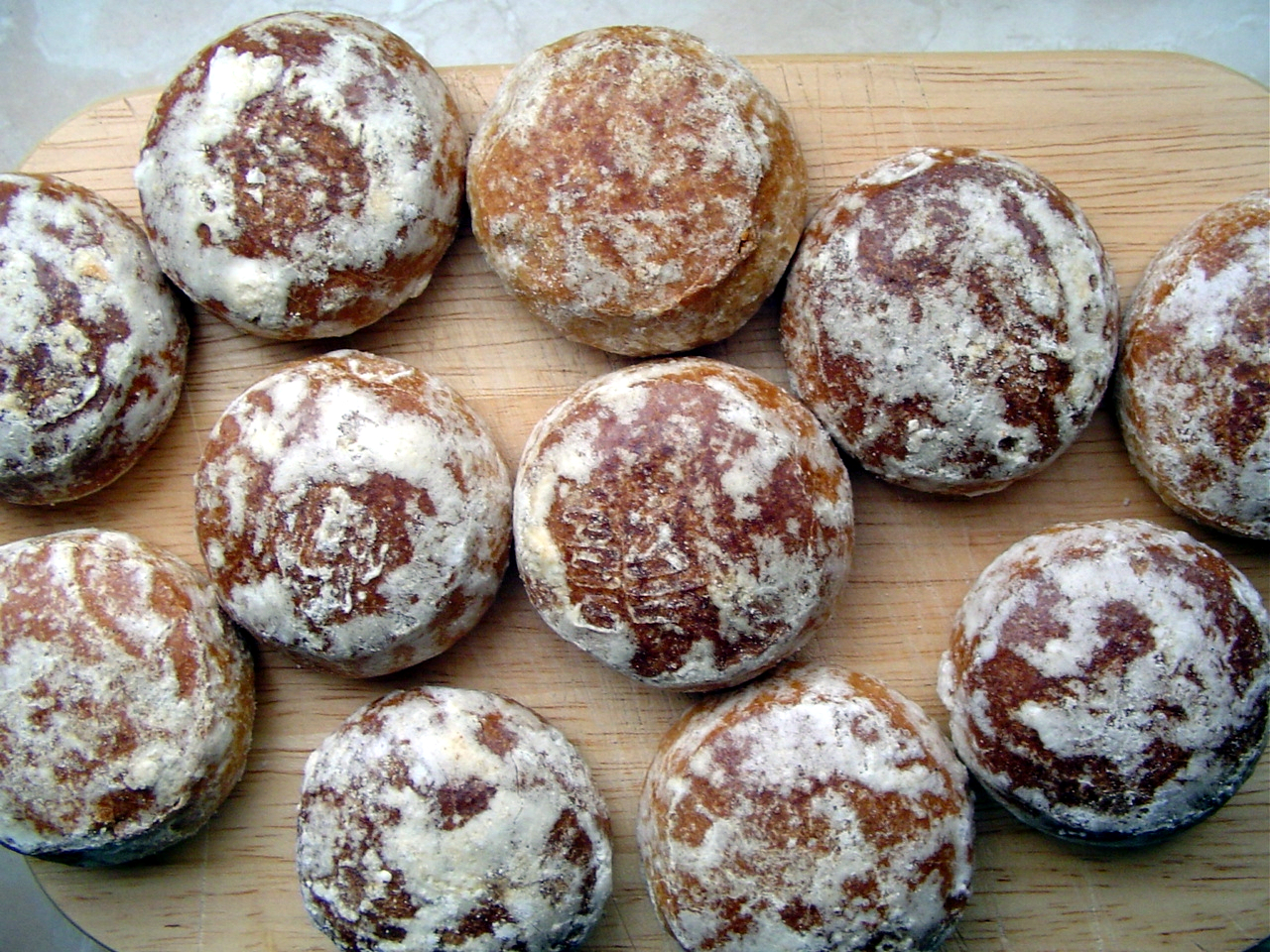
A common form of pryaniks

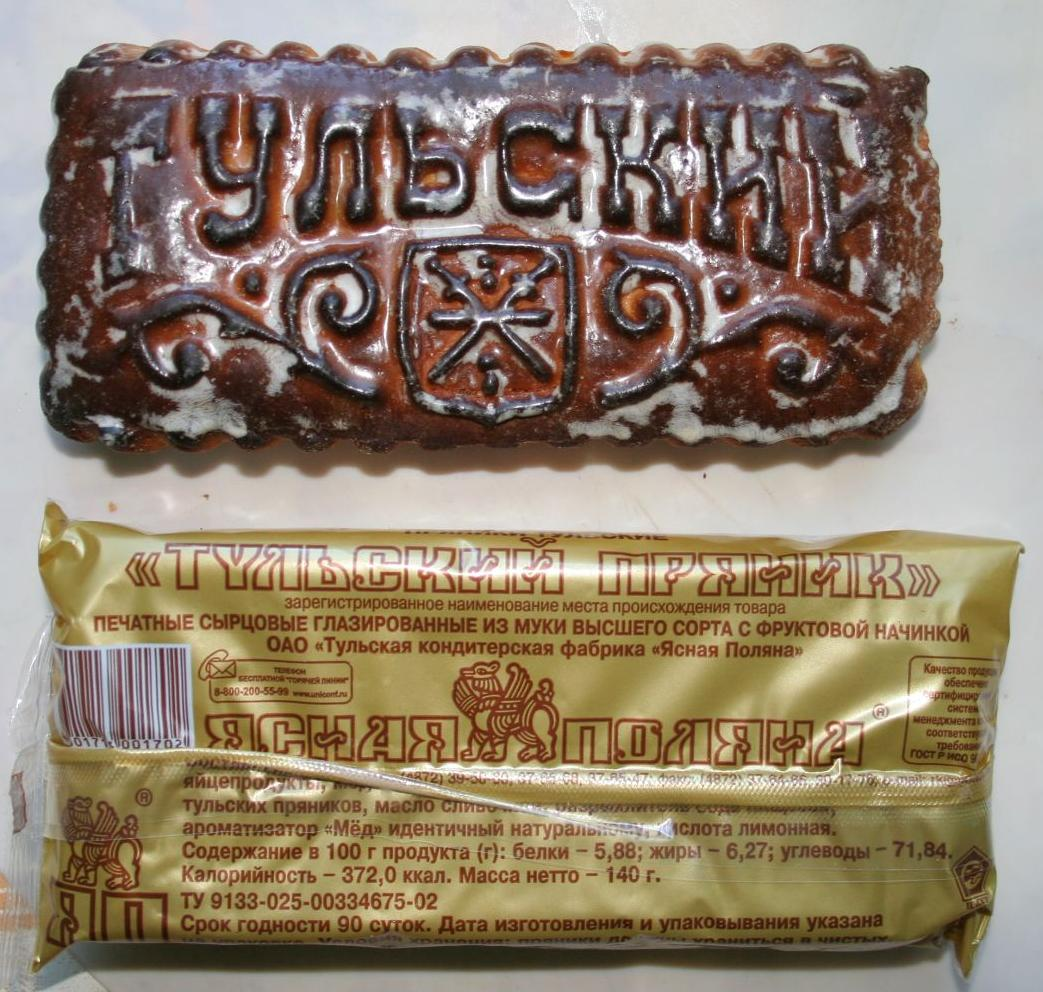
Commercial tula pryanik

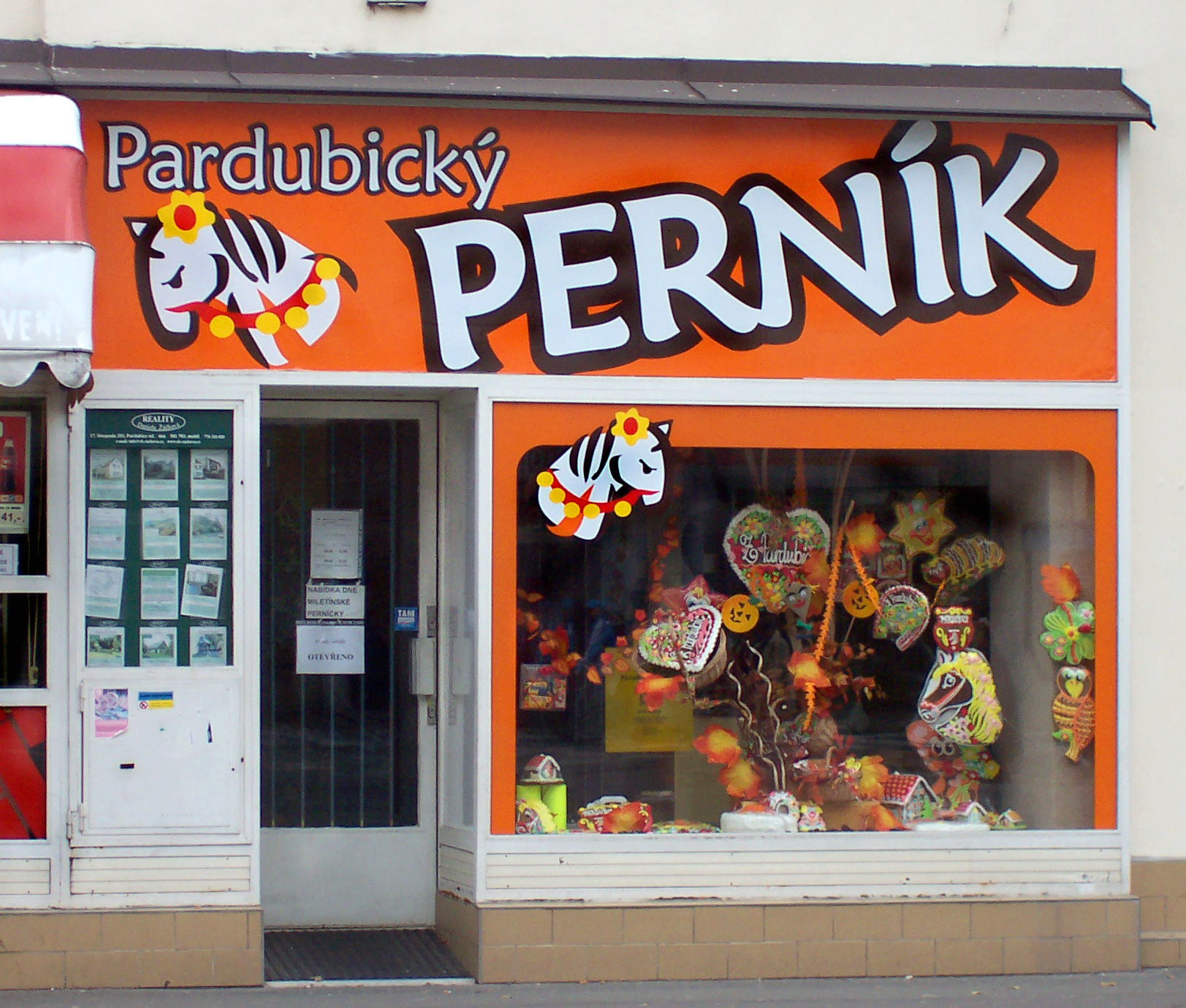
Perník shop in the Czech Republic

Pryanik (Russian: пряник [ˈprʲænʲɪk], Ukrainian: пряник, Belarusian: пернік; Czech and Slovak: perník; Polish: piernik [ˈpjɛrɲik]; Croatian: paprenjak) refers to a range of traditional sweet-baked goods in Russia, Ukraine, Belarus, Czechia, Slovenia (Slovene: medenjak), Poland and other countries such as Lithuania (Lithuanian: meduolis) and Bulgaria (Bulgarian: меденка).

Traditionally, pryaniks are made from flour and honey. While some Russian-English dictionaries translate pryanik as gingerbread, ginger is optional, unlike honey. Sugar is often used as substitution in place of honey in industrial production and modern home-cooking. Recipes may include eggs, milk, ginger, cinnamon and leavening agent like baking soda, activated with soured milk or vinegar. They can also have sugar glaze or icing as a topping and honey, fruit preserve or sweetened condensed milk as filling incorporated into the dough or sandwiched in between. The texture is denser and firmer than a cake, but moister and softer than a biscuit (cookie) and the form vary from oval to rectangular and from raised to flat. They are individually portioned, larger than a bite, but small enough to hold comfortably in the hand. Related to pryanik is kovrizhka (коврижка), known in western countries as a "fudge", sweet bread with similar ingredients.

The word pryanik is from Old East Slavic пьпьрянъ, an adjective from Old East Slavic пьпьрь 'pepper', which makes it etymologically similar or related to German Pfefferkuchen.

== See also ==
- Tula pryanik
- Duvshaniot
- Gingerbread
- Toruń gingerbread
- Lebkuchen
