= Gingerbread =

Spiced dough used for baking

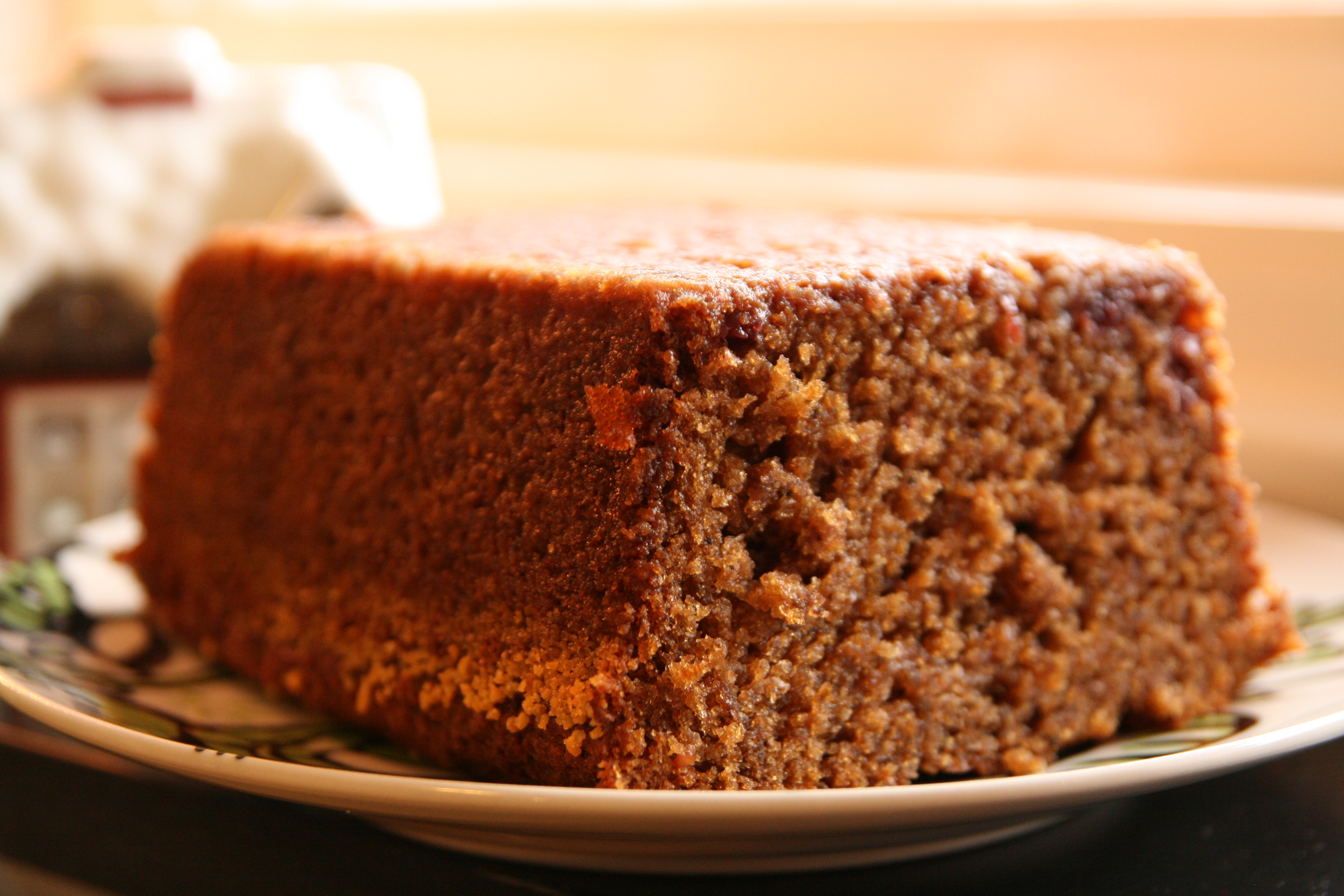
- Soft Swedish pepparkaka
- Main ingredients: Ginger root, honey or molasses

Gingerbread refers to a broad category of baked goods, typically flavored with ginger, cloves, nutmeg, and cinnamon and sweetened with honey, sugar, or molasses. Gingerbread foods vary, ranging from a moist loaf cake to forms nearly as crisp as a ginger snap.

== Etymology ==
Originally, the term gingerbread (from Latin zingiber via Old French gingebras) referred to preserved ginger. It then referred to a confection made with honey and spices. Gingerbread is often used to translate the French term pain d'épices (lit. 'spice bread') or the German and Polish terms Pfefferkuchen and Piernik respectively (lit. 'pepper cake' because it used to contain pepper) or Lebkuchen (of unclear etymology). Pepper is also referred to in regional names like Norwegian pepperkaker or Czech perník (originally peprník).

The meaning of gingerbread has evolved over time. For centuries the term referred to a traditional European pastry, very like a modern cookie, traditionally used to make gingerbread men. In the United States the first known recipe for "Soft gingerbread to be baked in pans" is found in Amelia Simmons' 1796 cookbook, American Cookery.

== History ==
Gingerbread is claimed to have been brought to Europe in 992 AD by the Armenian monk Gregory of Nicopolis (also called Gregory Makar and Grégoire de Nicopolis). He left Nicopolis (in modern-day western Greece) to live in Bondaroy (north-central France), near the town of Pithiviers. He stayed there for seven years until he died in 999 and taught gingerbread baking to French Christians. It may have been brought to Western Europe from the eastern Mediterranean in the 11th century.

Piperatas Tortas Facientes from the 7th of February 1293 and documented in Świdnica (at the time the Duchy of Świdnica and Jawor, now Poland) is the oldest mention of gingerbread in Central Europe. Since the 13th century, Toruń gingerbread was made in Toruń, then State of the Teutonic Order (now Poland). It gained fame in the realm and abroad when it was brought to Sweden by German immigrants. In 15th-century Germany, a gingerbread guild controlled production. Early references from the Vadstena Abbey show that the Swedish nuns baked gingerbread to ease indigestion in 1444. It was the custom to bake white biscuits and paint them as window decorations. In England, gingerbread was also thought to have medicinal properties. 16th-century writer John Baret described gingerbread as "a kinde of cake or paste made to comfort the stomacke."

Gingerbread was a popular treat at medieval European festivals and fairs, and there were even dedicated gingerbread fairs.

The first documented trade of gingerbread biscuits in England dates to the 16th century, where they were sold in monasteries, pharmacies, and town square farmers' markets. One hundred years later, the town of Market Drayton in Shropshire became known for its gingerbread, as is displayed on their town's welcome sign, stating that it is the "home of gingerbread". The first recorded mention of gingerbread being baked in the town dates to 1793, although it was probably made earlier, as ginger had been stocked in high street businesses since the 1640s. Gingerbread became widely available in the 18th century.

Gingerbread came to the Americas with settlers from Europe. Molasses, less expensive than sugar, soon became a common ingredient and produced a softer cake. The first printed American cookbook, American Cookery by Amelia Simmons, contained seven different recipes for gingerbread. Her recipe for "Soft gingerbread to be baked in pans" is the first written recipe for the cakey old-fashioned American gingerbread.

== Varieties ==
=== England and Scotland ===
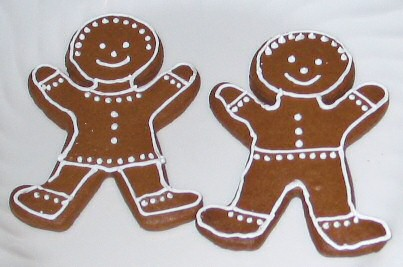
Iced gingerbread men

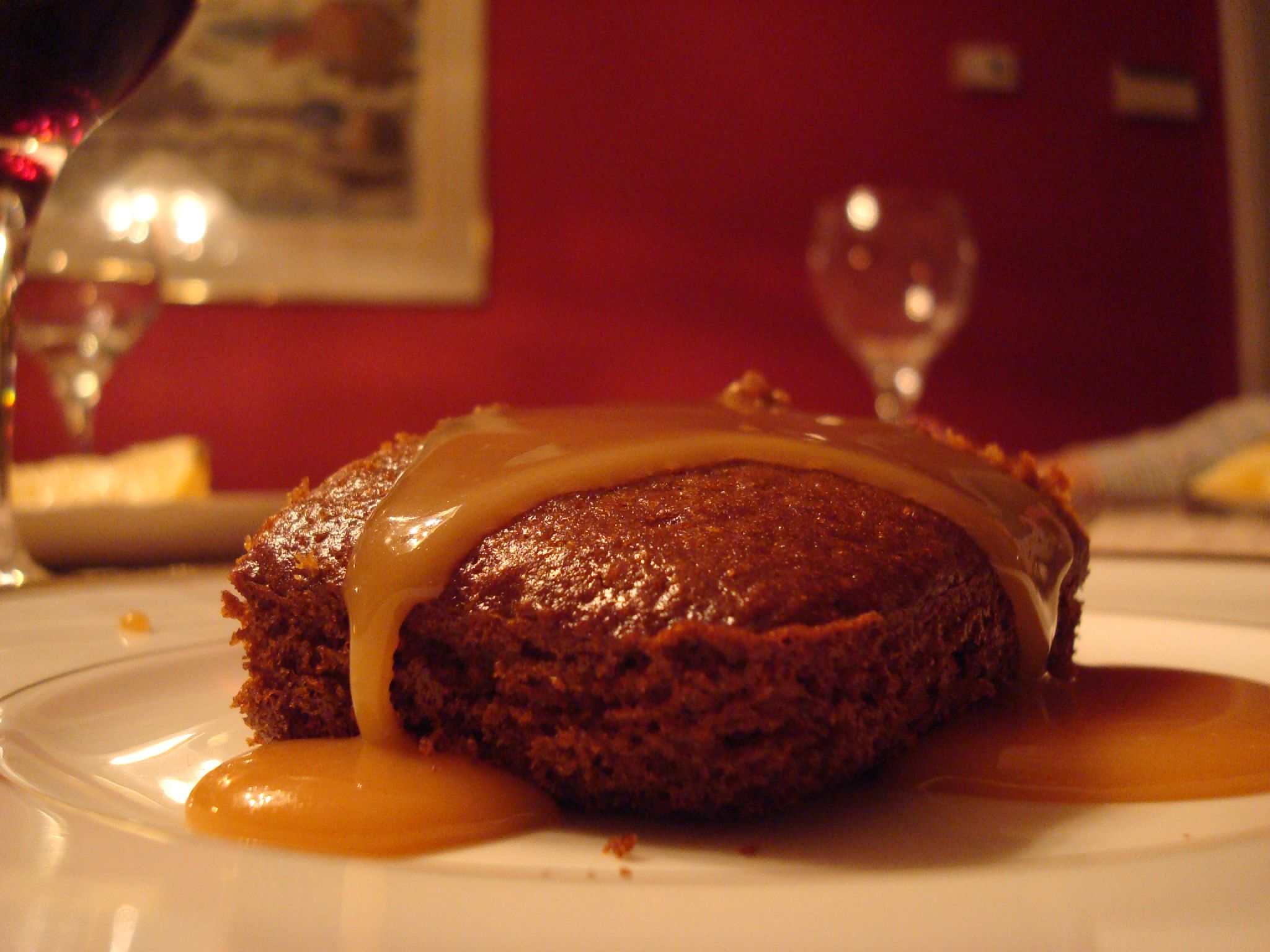
Gingerbread cake

In England, gingerbread may refer to a cake or a type of biscuit made with ginger. In the biscuit form, it commonly takes the form of a gingerbread man. Gingerbread men were first attributed to the court of Queen Elizabeth I, who served the figurines to foreign dignitaries. Today, however, they are generally served around Christmas. Gingerbread was a traditional confectionery sold at popular fairs, often given as a treat or token of affection to children and lovers "sweethearts" and known as a "fairing" of gingerbread – the name retained now only by Cornish fairings. This crisp brittle type of gingerbread is now represented by the popular commercial version called the ginger nut biscuit.

"Parliament cake" or "Parlies", a very spicy ginger shortbread, were eaten (in the same way as salty snacks with beer), with whisky, rum or brandy, during midday breaks, by the members of the original (pre-1707) Scottish Parliament, in a secret backroom (ben the hoose), at a tavern and shop in Bristo Street in Edinburgh's Potterrow, behind the university, run by a Mrs Flockhart, AKA Luckie Fykie, the landlady who is thought to be the inspiration for Mrs Flockhart in Walter Scott's Waverley. The recipe is mentioned in Christian Isobel Johnstone's The Cook and Housewife's Manual (also known as Meg Dod's Cookery) (1826) published under the pseudonym of "Mrs. Margaret Dods, of the Cleikum Inn, Saint Ronan's", evoking the character of Margaret Dods, the hostess of the Cleikum Inn in Walter Scott's novel Saint Ronan's Well (1823). It was immensely popular, and in which, she used characters Scott's to give commentary on preparing national specialties.

Parkin is a form of soft gingerbread cake made with oatmeal and treacle which is popular in northern England, originating in Yorkshire.

=== Americas ===
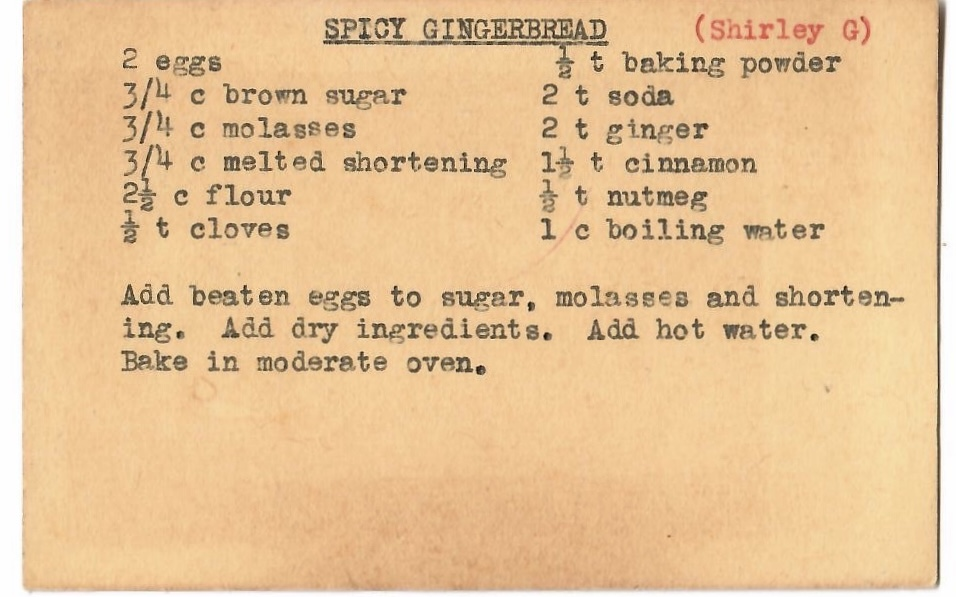
Spicy gingerbread recipe, Michigan c. 1950

In the United States, this form of gingerbread is sometimes called "gingerbread cake" or "ginger cake" to distinguish it from the harder forms. French pain d'épices is somewhat similar, though generally slightly drier, and involves honey rather than treacle and uses less spice than other breads in this category.

In Panama, a confection named yiyinbre is a gingerbread cake made with ginger and molasses; it is typical of the region of Chiriquí. Another popular confection is quequi or queque, a chewy biscuit made with ginger, molasses, and coconut.

In Brazil, "Pão de Mel", literally meaning honey bread, is a popular treat; it consists in a type of gingerbread made with honey and other spices in small circles with a chocolate covering and can be found traditionally filled with doce de leite.

=== Europe ===
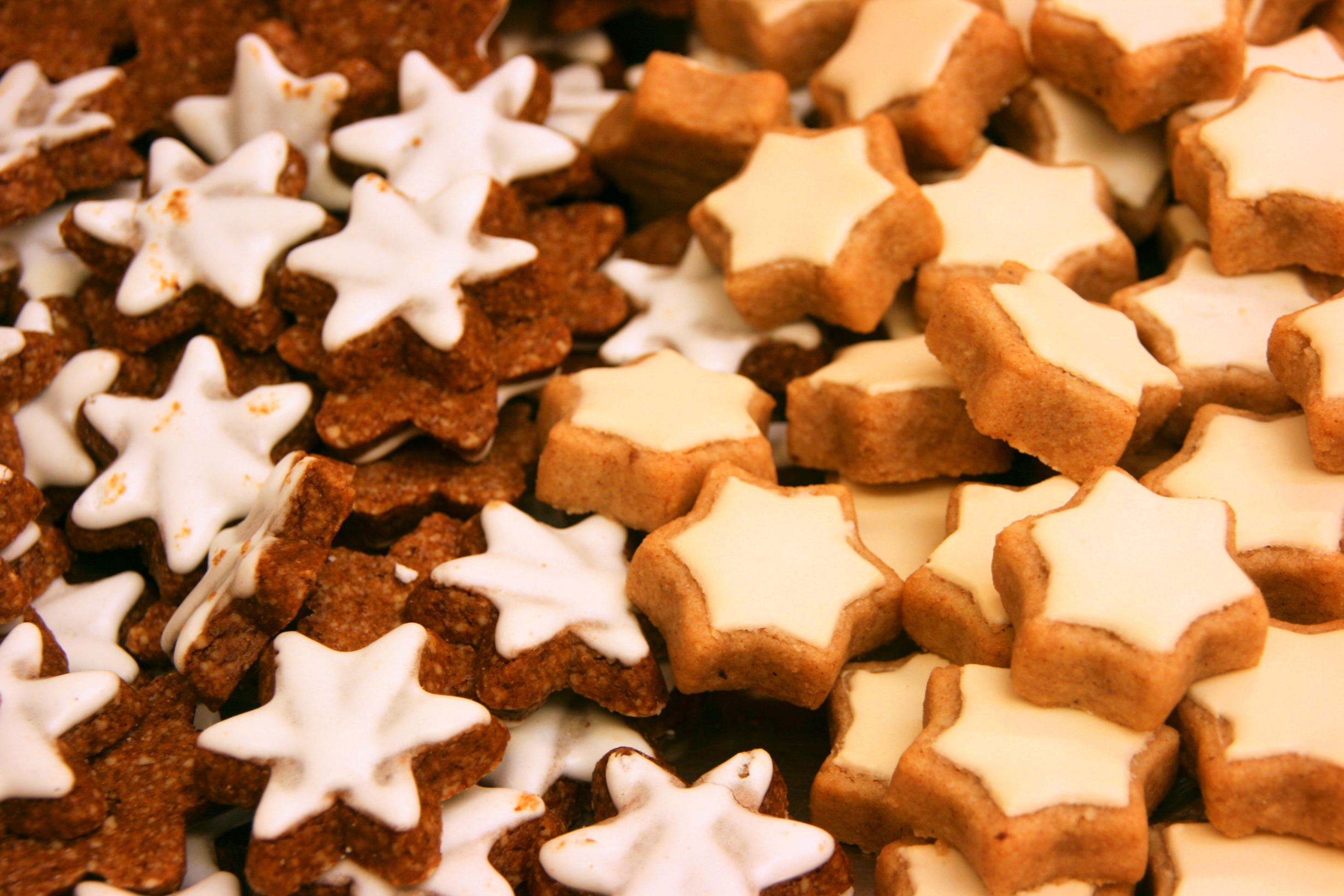
Austrian Christmas star-shaped gingerbread cookies

.

In Ashkenazi Jewish cuisine, the honey cake eaten at Rosh Hashanah (New Year) closely resembles the Dutch peperkoek or the German Lebkuchen, though it has wide regional variations.

A variety of gingerbread in Bulgaria is known as меденка ("made of honey"). Traditionally the cookie is as big as the palm of a hand, round and flat, and with a thin layer of chocolate. Other common ingredients include honey, cinnamon, ginger, and dried clove.

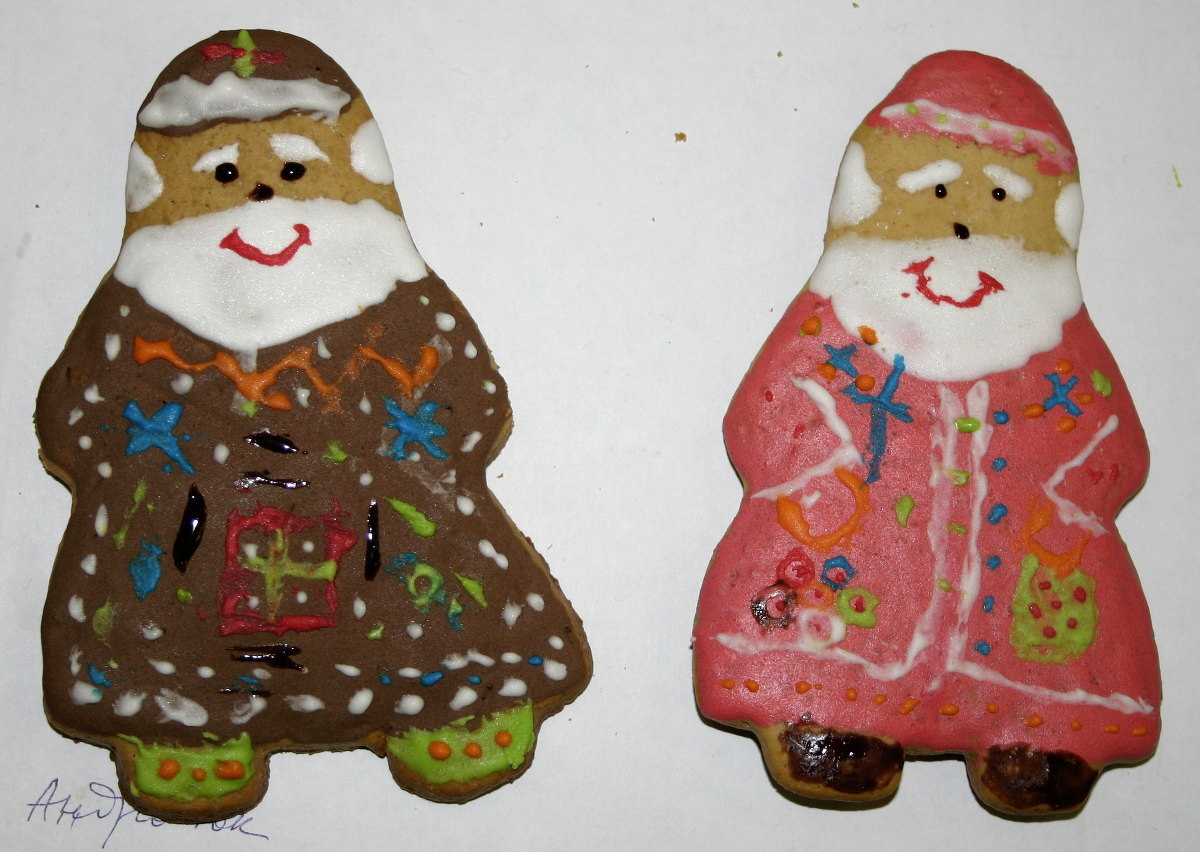
Ukrainian Mykolajchyky

In the Czech Republic, gingerbread is called perník and it is a popular Christmas biscuit and a decoration. Common shapes include hearts, stars and animals and gingerbread houses are also popular. Towns associated with perník include Pardubice and Miletín.

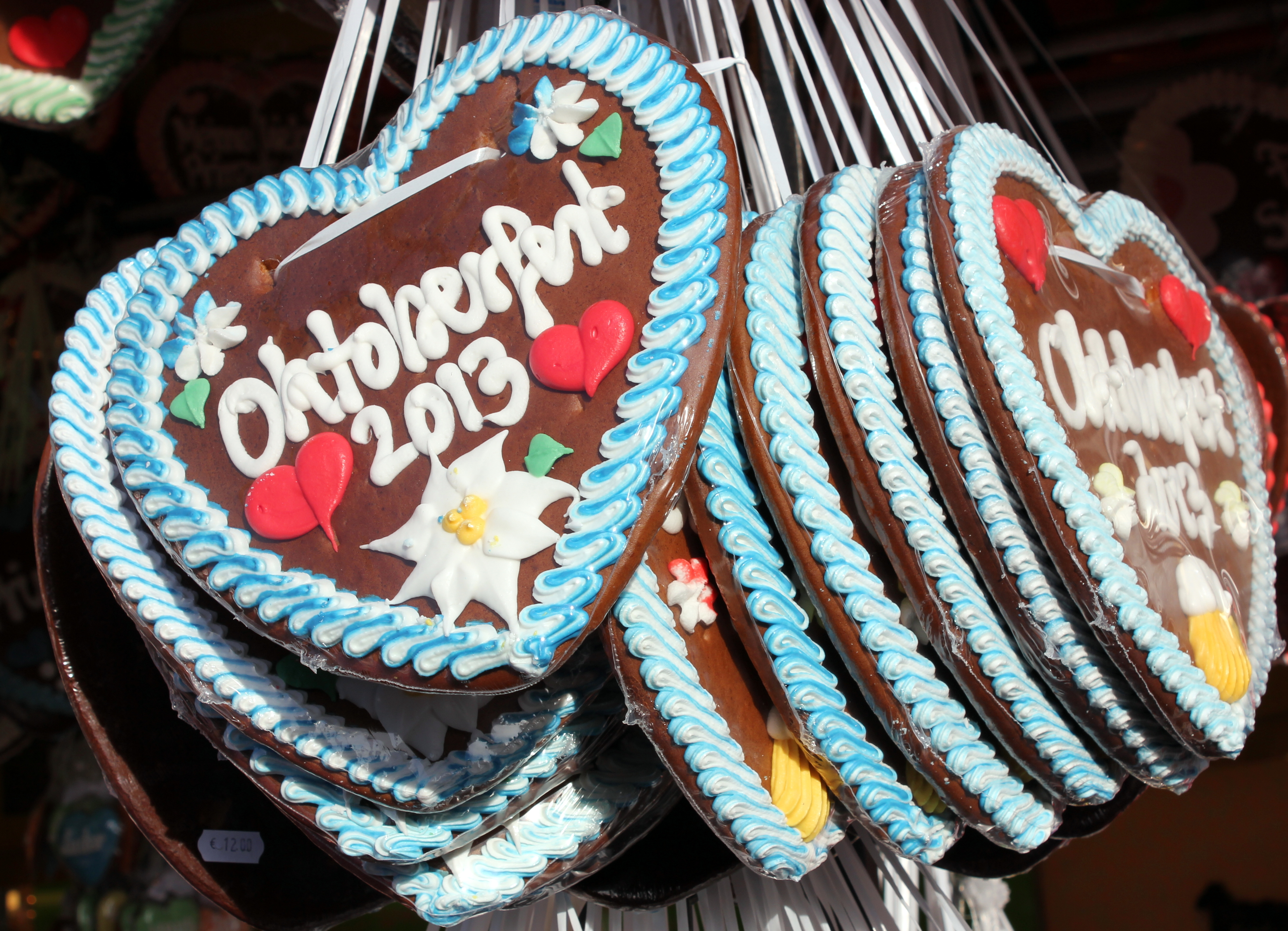
Gingerbread hearts from Oktoberfest

In Germany gingerbread is made in two forms: a soft form called Lebkuchen and a harder form, particularly associated with carnivals and street markets such as the Christmas markets that occur in many German towns. The hard gingerbread is made in decorative shapes, which are then further decorated with sweets and icing. The tradition of cutting gingerbread into shapes takes many other forms and exists in many countries, a well-known example being the gingerbread man. Traditionally, these were dunked in port wine. At Oktoberfest in Munich, it is customary for men to buy large gingerbread cookies in the shape of a heart, with a ribbon for their sweetheart to wear around their neck. The cookies are iced with romantic phrases like "Ich liebe dich" (I love you).

In the Netherlands and Belgium, a soft and crumbly gingerbread called peperkoek, kruidkoek or ontbijtkoek is popularly served at breakfast time or during the day, thickly sliced and often topped with butter.

In Northern Europe, the Nordic and Baltic countries, the most popular form of ginger confection is the pepperkaker (Norwegian), pepparkakor (Swedish), peberkager (Danish), piparkökur (Icelandic), piparkakut (Finnish), piparkūkas (Latvian) or piparkoogid (Estonian). They are thin, brittle biscuits that are particularly associated with the extended Christmas period. In Norway and Sweden, pepperkaker/pepparkakor are also used as window decorations (the pepperkaker/pepparkakor are a little thicker than usual and are decorated with glaze and candy). Many families bake pepperkaker/pepparkakor/brunkager as a tradition.

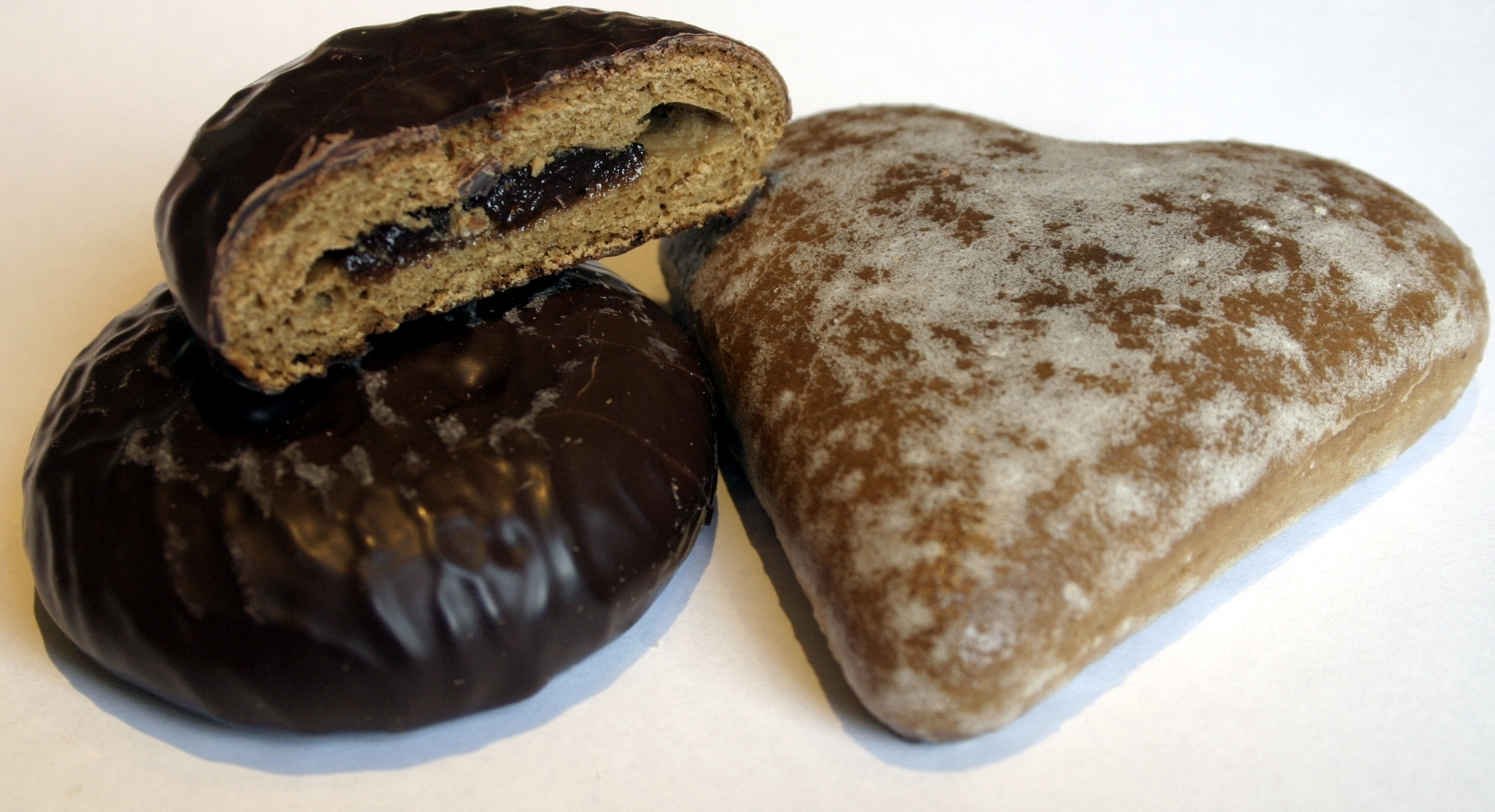
Traditional Toruń gingerbread

In Poland, gingerbreads are known as pierniki (singular: piernik). Some cities have traditional regional styles. Toruń gingerbread (piernik toruński) is a traditional Polish gingerbread that has been produced since the Middle Ages in the city of Toruń. It was a favorite delicacy of Chopin when he visited his godfather, Fryderyk Florian Skarbek, in Toruń during school vacation. Kraków gingerbread is the traditional style of the former Polish capital.

In Romania, gingerbread is called turtă dulce and usually has sugar glazing.

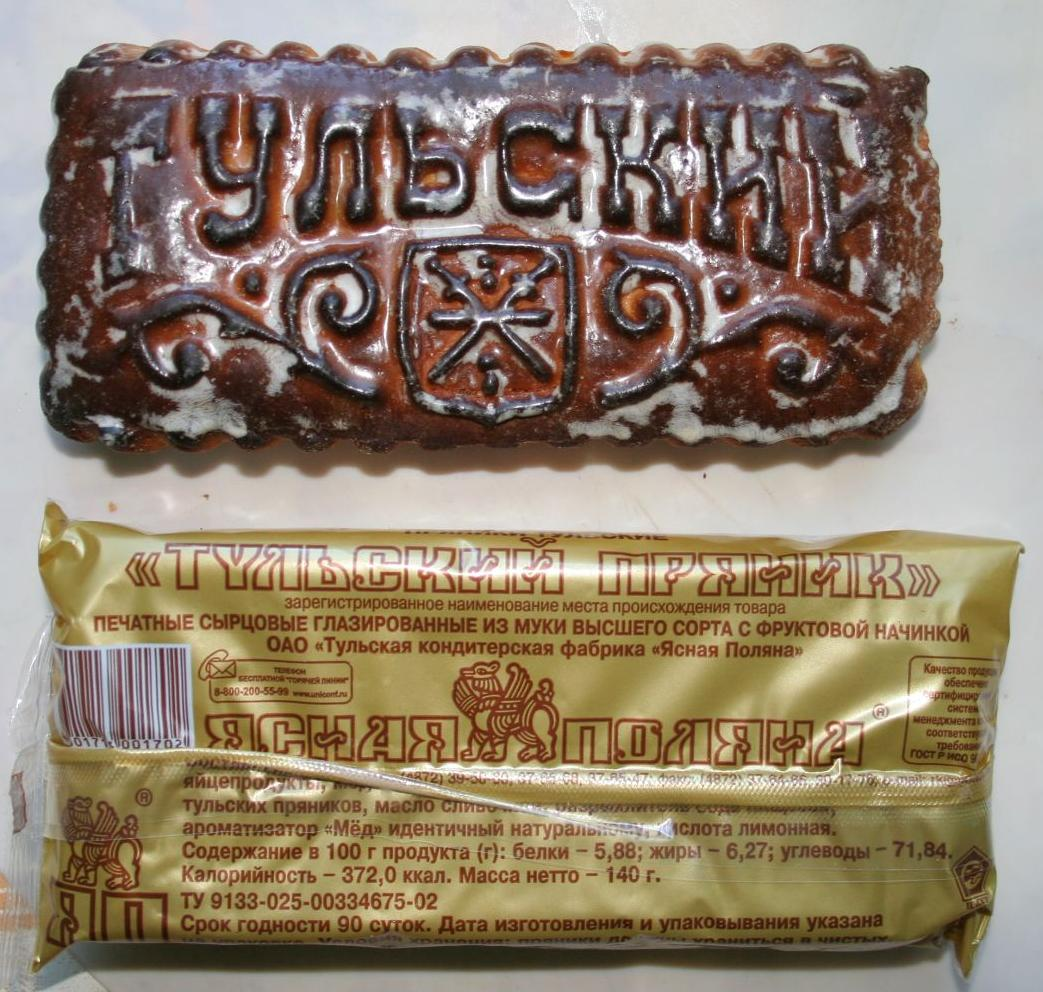
Tula gingerbread

In Russia, a gingerbread maker was first mentioned in Kazan cadastres in 1568. Gingerbread confections are called pryaniki (sg. pryanik), derived from the Russian term for 'spices'. Historically three main centers of gingerbread production have developed in the cities of Vyazma, Gorodets, and Tula. Gingerbreads from Tver, Saint Petersburg, and Moscow were also well known in the Russian Empire. A classic Russian gingerbread is made with rye flour, honey, sugar, butter, eggs and various spices; it has an embossed ornament or text on the front side with royal icing. A Russian gingerbread can also be shaped in various forms and stuffed with varenje and other sweet fillings.

In Switzerland, a gingerbread confection known as "biber" is typically a two-centimeter (approximately ¾ of an inch) thick rectangular gingerbread cake with a marzipan filling. The cantons of Appenzell and St. Gallen is famous for biber, which are artfully adorned with images of the Appenzell bear or the St. Gallen cathedral respectively by engraving or icing.

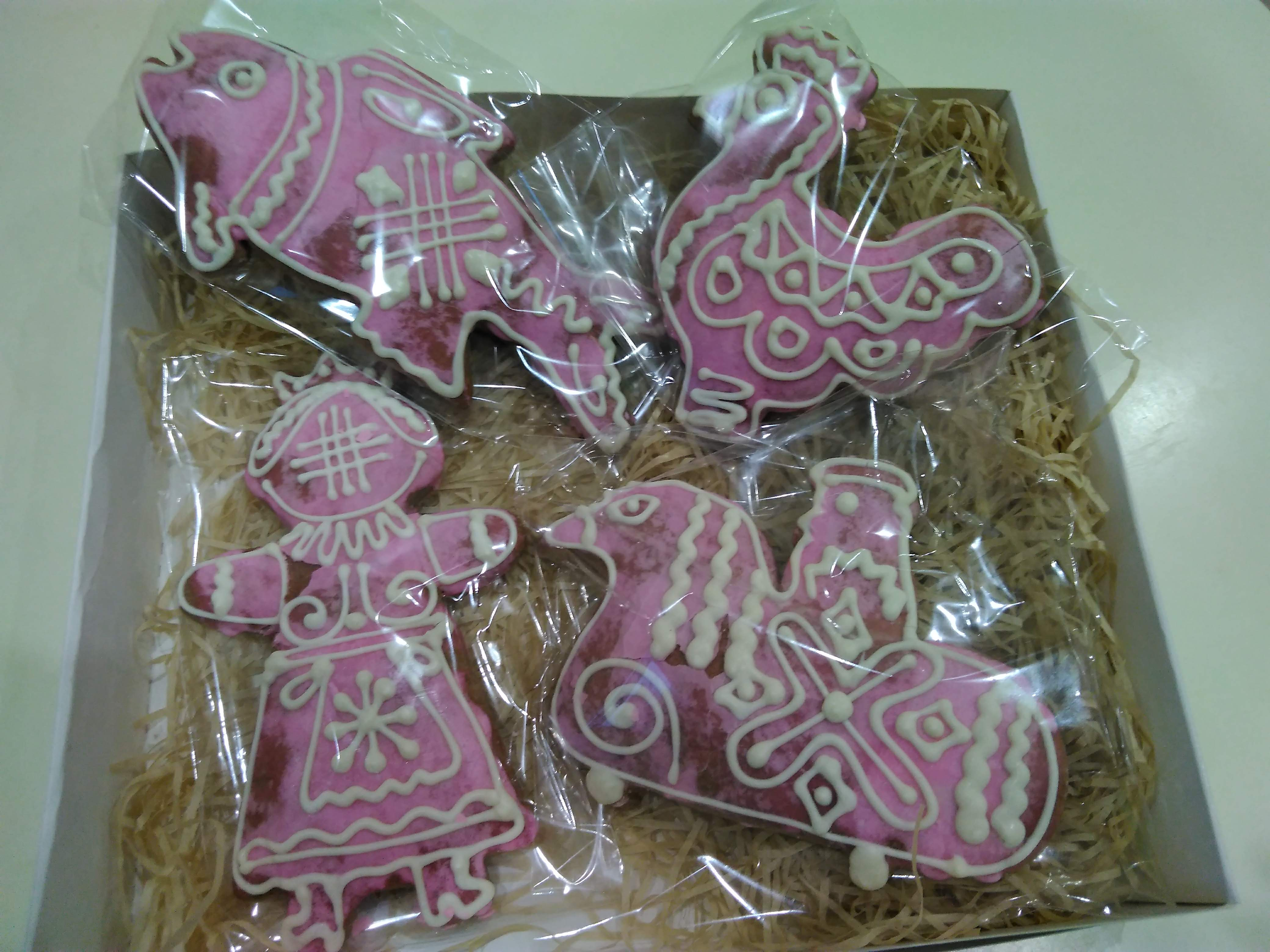
Ukrainian Panyanky

In Ukraine, medivnyk ("made of honey") means either dry honey cookie (a prianyk, also called medyanyk) or a spongy honey cake (a fruitcake). Mykolaychyky are traditional Western Ukrainian cookies or gingerbread that are baked for St. Nicholas Day and given to children. Panyanky are usually baked for Christmas Eve in Eastern Ukraine. They are pink because they are colored with beet juice.

== See also ==
- Aachener Printen
- Dutch carnival cake
- Ginger snaps
- Gingerbread Museum
- Lebkuchen – German honey-sweetened cake
- Licitar – Decorated honey biscuit from Croatia and Slovenia
- List of sweet breads
- Ontbijtkoek – Spiced rye cake
- Pain d'épices – French spiced cake
