= Medovik =

Russian/Ukrainian layer cake

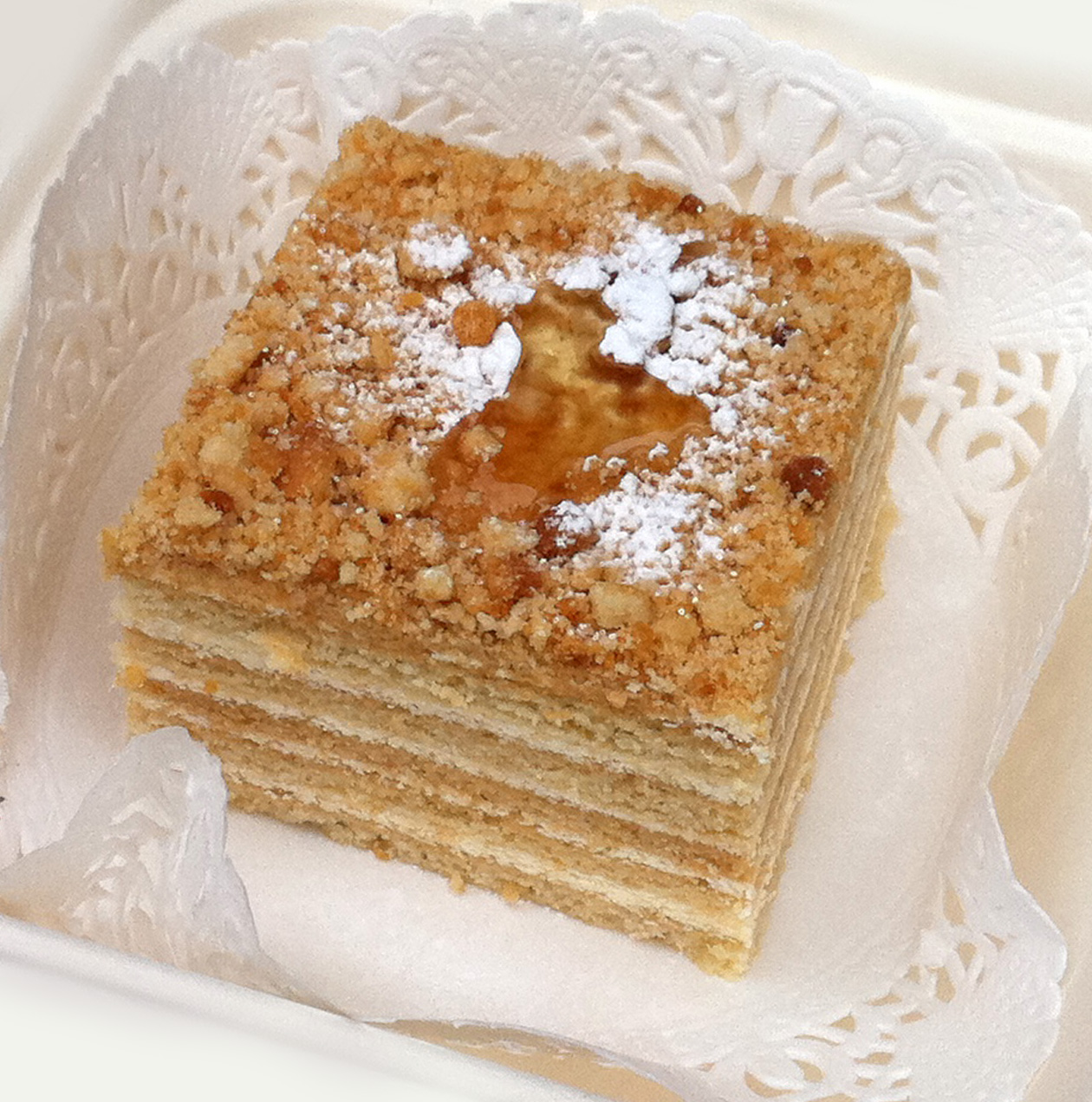
- Medovik
- Place of origin: Soviet Union
- Main ingredients: Flour, eggs, sugar, honey, smetana or condensed milk

Medovik (Russian: медови́к [mʲɪdɐˈvʲik]; from мёд, 'honey', Ukrainian: медовик [medovyk], Belarusian: мядовік [miadovyk]) is a layer cake popular in countries of the former Soviet Union. The identifying ingredients are honey and smetana (sour cream) or condensed milk.

The dessert, famous for its lengthy preparation time, consists of layers of sponge cake with a cream filling and is often covered with nuts or crumbs made from leftover cake. While the thin layers harden shortly after coming out of the oven, the moisture of the filling softens it again over time. There are many recipes and variations of this cake, but the main ingredient is honey, giving it its characteristic taste and flavor.

== Legend of the origin ==
According to Russian tradition, the cake was created in the 19th century in the Russian Empire by a young chef who sought to impress Empress Elizabeth Alexeievna, wife of Alexander I. Empress Elizabeth could not stand honey and any dish made with it. One day a young new confectioner in the imperial kitchen, unaware of the empress's dislike, baked a new cake with honey and thick sour cream. Surprisingly, and unaware of the honey content, Empress Elizabeth immediately fell in love with it. Despite this legend, medovik is not mentioned in any of the 19th-century Russian cookbooks. Medovik gained its intense popularity during the Soviet era. Today, there are numerous variations of medovik: with condensed milk, buttercream or custard.

== Similar dishes ==
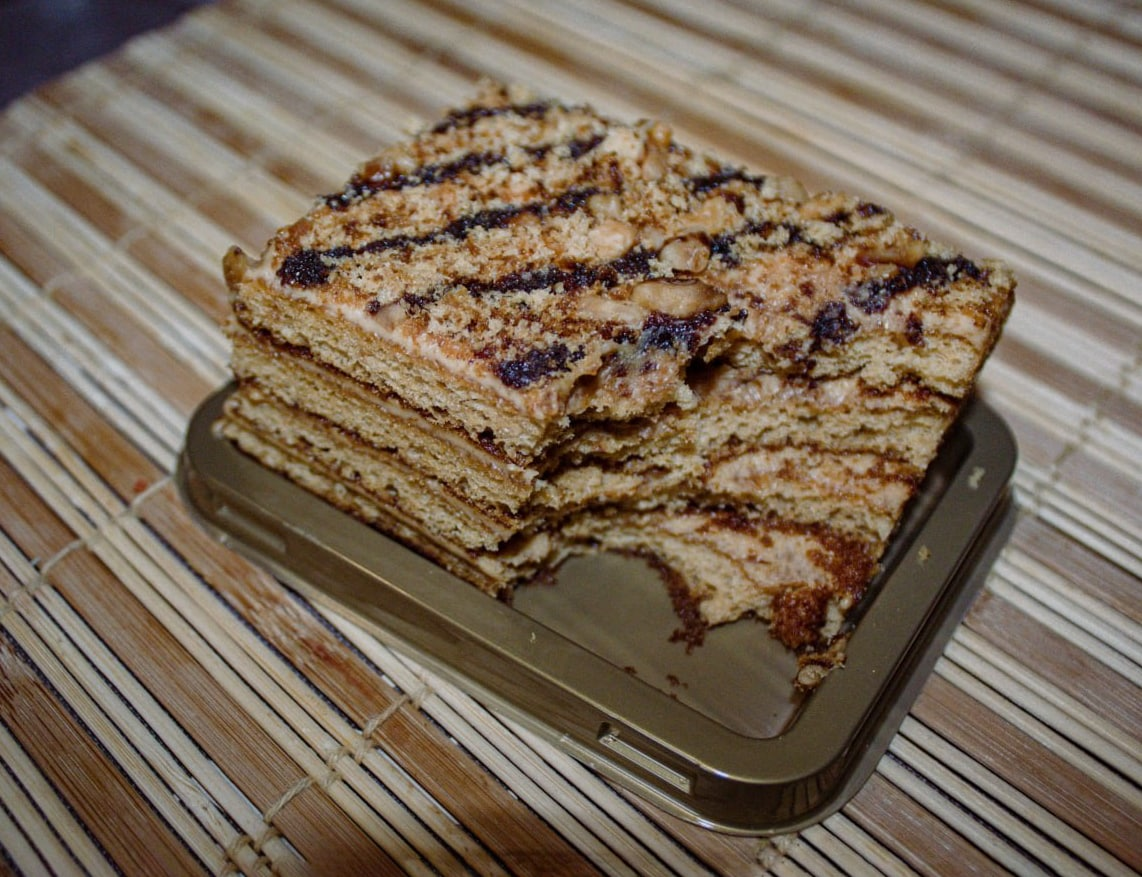
Marlenka cake, prepared based on an old Armenian family recipe

Desserts similar to medovik are also popular in other Eastern and Central European countries as well as Caucasus countries. There is the Czech medovnik, Lithuanian medutis, the Polish miodownik, the Armenian marlenka. In Bulgaria, medovik is mostly known under the name "French village cake". Ukrainian medivnyk is cooked without the cream. The Albanian shendetlie is a cake containing honey and walnuts.

== See also ==
- List of cakes
