= List of Polish dishes =

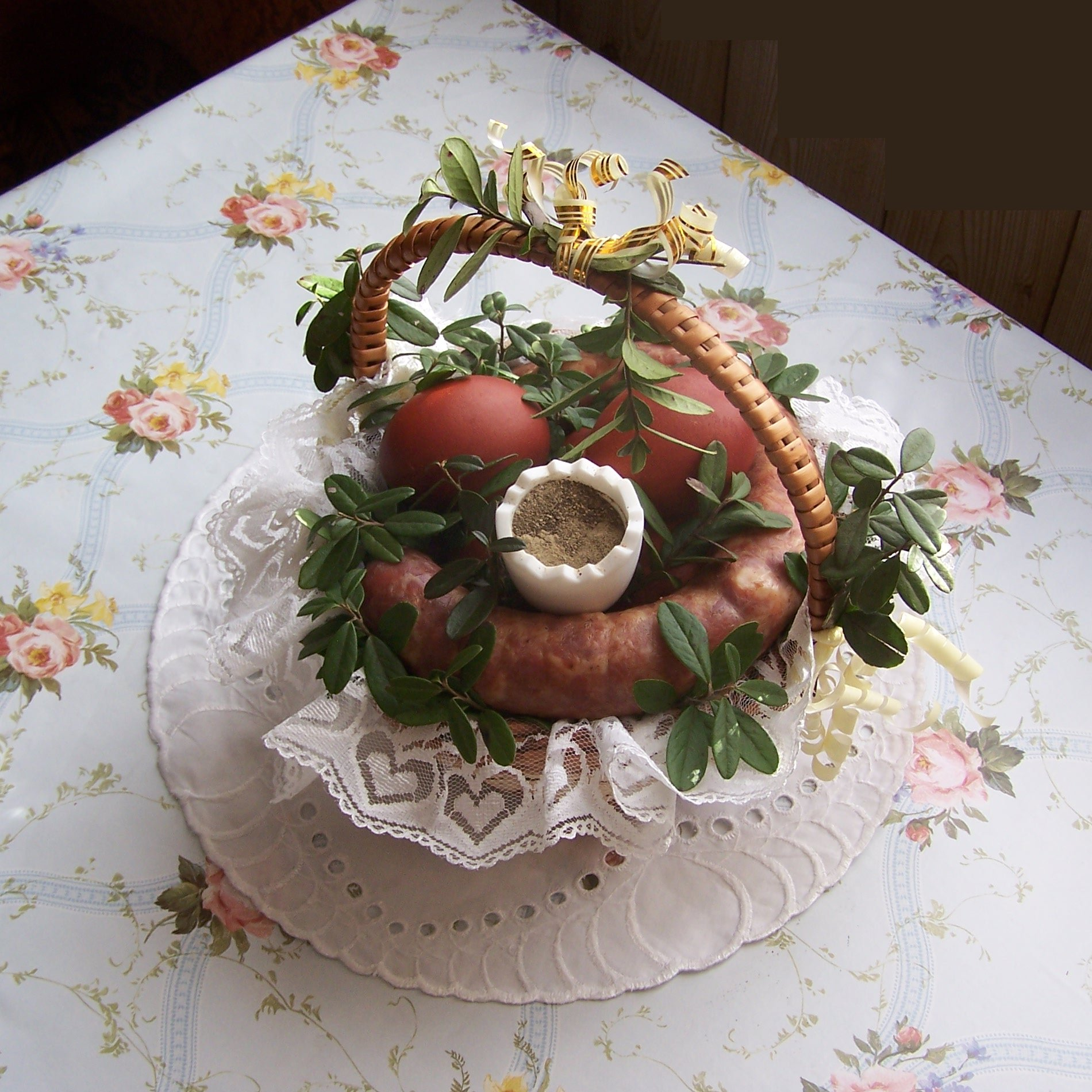
Traditional Polish custom of blessing food on Holy Saturday. This Święconka basket contains kiełbasa, boiled eggs, salt, pepper and bread, and is decorated with bilberry leaves. Blessed food is eaten at Easter breakfast.

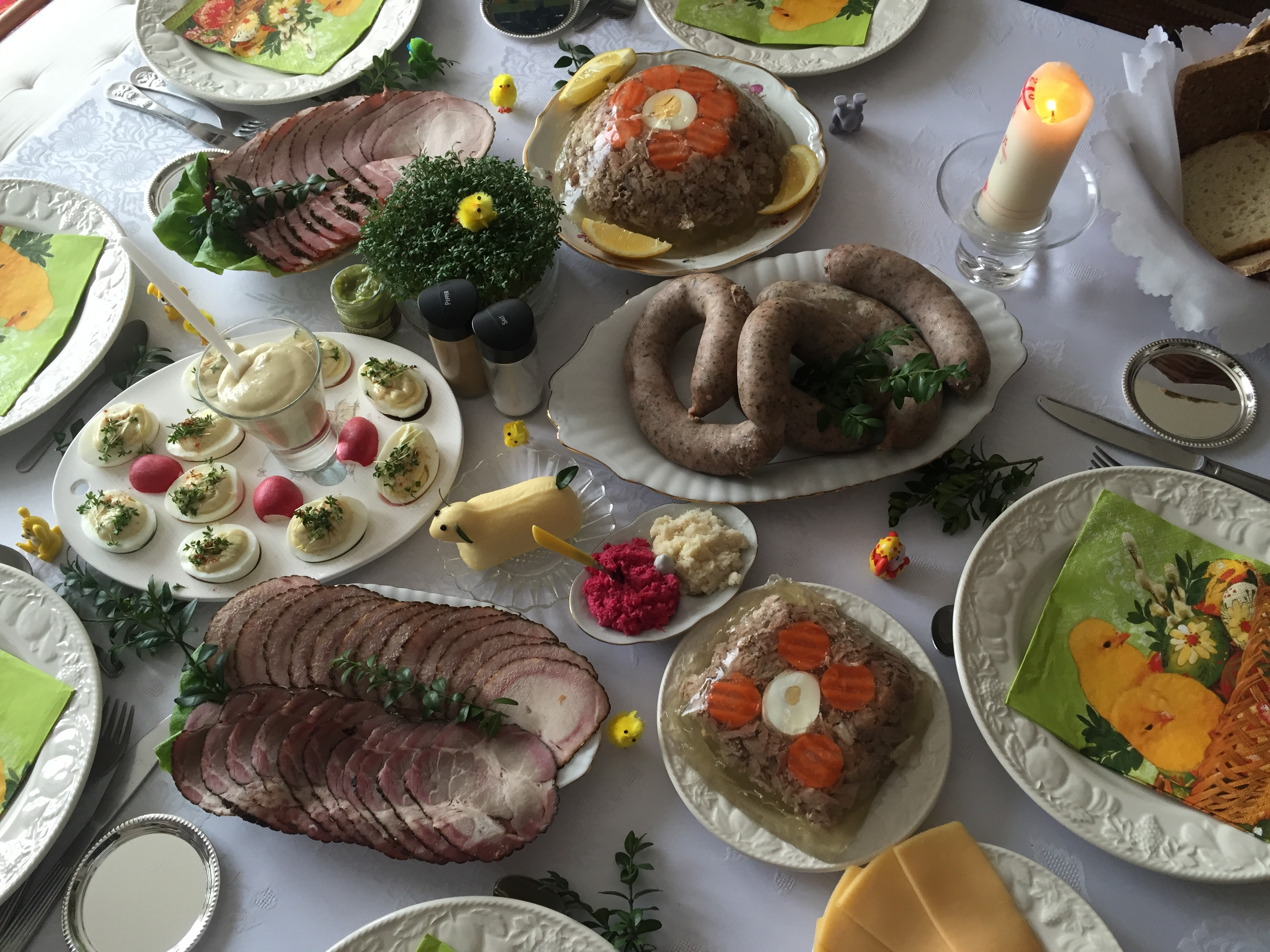
Polish Easter breakfast

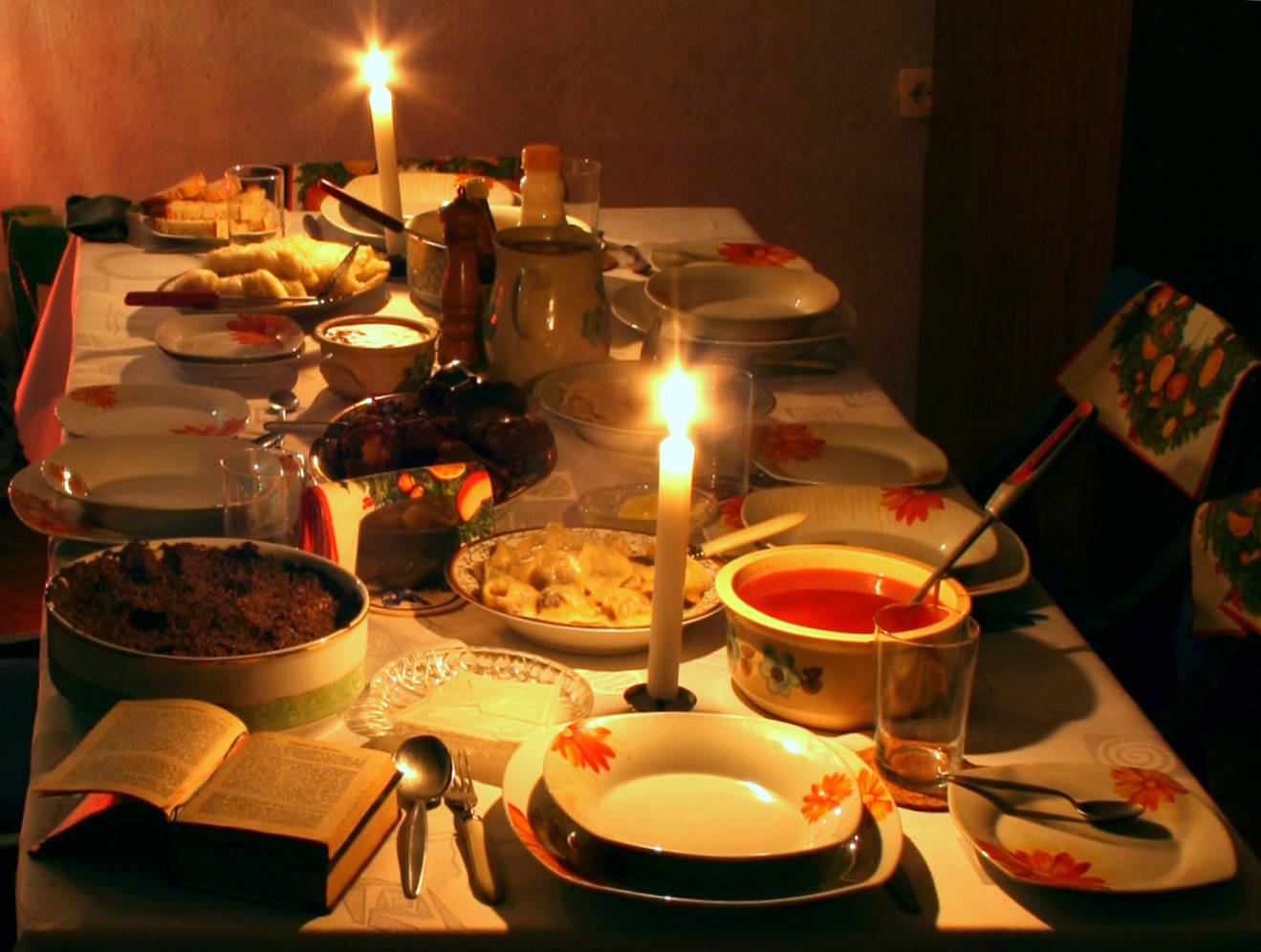
Wigilia – traditional Christmas Eve supper in Poland

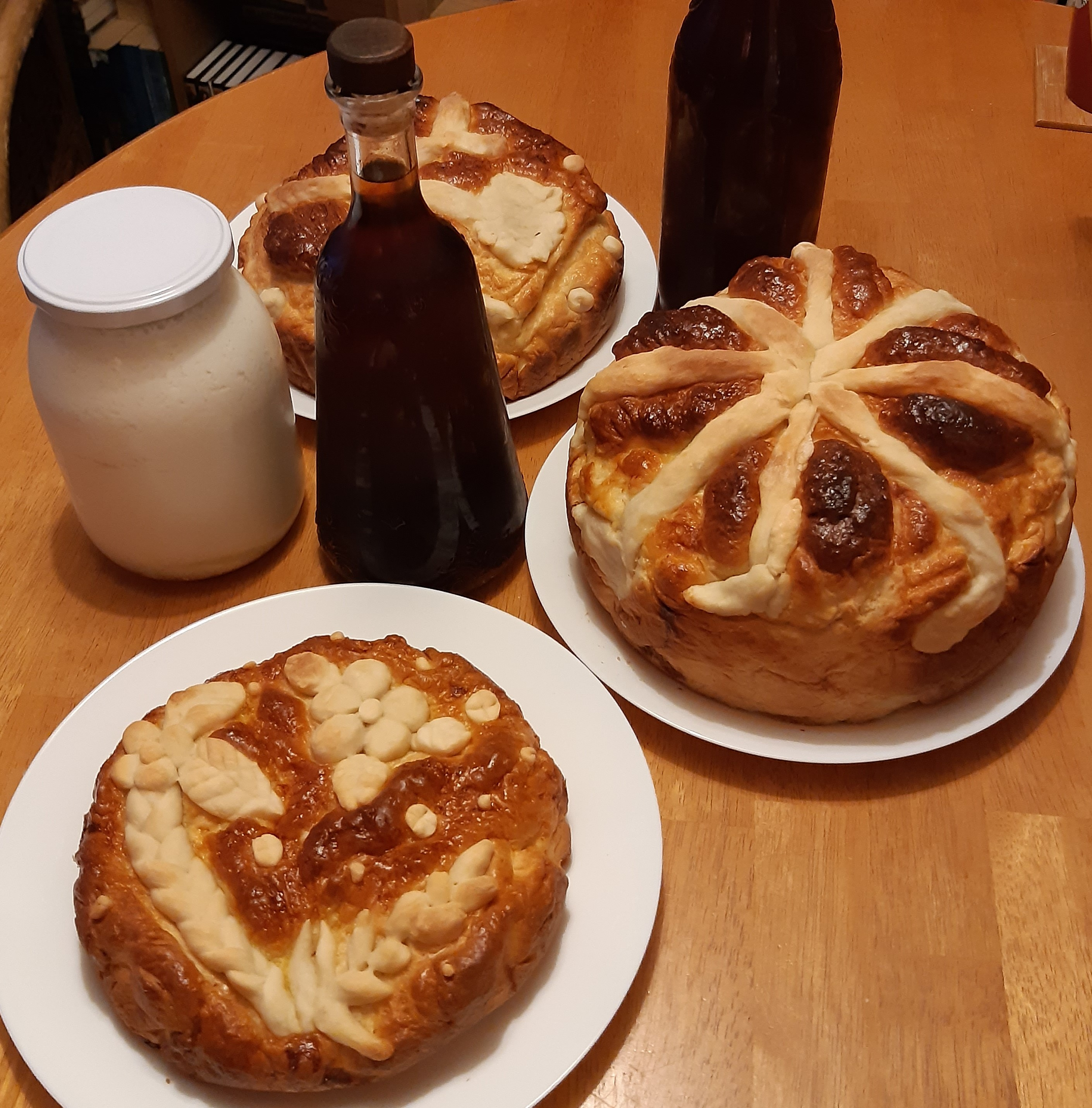
Traditional Polish wedding breads kołacz and korowaj served alongside homemade kwas chlebowy and kefir

This is a list of dishes found in Polish cuisine.

== Soups ==
- Barszcz – its strictly vegetarian version is the first course during the Christmas Eve feast, served with uszka (tiny ear-shaped dumplings) with mushroom filling (sauerkraut can be used as well, depending on the family tradition).
- Barszcz biały – sour rye and pork broth with cubed boiled pork, kielbasa, ham, hard-boiled egg, and dried breads (rye, pumpernickel)
- Chłodnik (chłodnik litewski) – cold soup (also known as summer soup) made of soured milk or buttermilk, young beet leaves, beets, cucumbers and chopped fresh dill.
- Chłodnik owocowy – cold fruit soup, recipes include variations with strawberries, rasberries, currants, blueberries, cherries, plums and apples
- Czernina – duck blood soup
- Flaki or flaczki – beef or pork guts tripe stew with marjoram. The word “flaki” means guts. In some areas it is made out of a cow's stomach cut in strips.
- Grochówka – pea and/or lentil soup
- Kapuśniak – cabbage/sauerkraut soup
- Kartoflanka – potato soup
- Kiszczonka – traditional dish from Greater Poland, consisting of black pudding, flour, milk and spices.
- Krupnik – barley soup with chicken, beef, carrots or vegetable broth
- Kwaśnica – traditional sauerkraut soup, eaten in the south of Poland
- Owsianka – oat milk soup
- Zupa cytrynowa – lemon soup made with chicken broth, lemon and sour cream
- Rosół z kury – chicken noodle soup
- Rosół wolowy – beef broth soup
- Rosół z ryby – fish broth soup
- Rumpuć – thick vegetable soup, characteristic of Wielkopolska cuisine
- Zupa borowikowa – boletus mushroom soup
- Zupa buraczkowa – red beetroot soup with potatoes, similar to traditional barszcz
- Zupa cebulowa – onion soup
- Zupa kalafiorowa – cauliflower soup
- Zupa koprowa – dill soup
- Zupa grzybowa/pieczarkowa – mushroom soup made of various species
- Zupa jarzynowa – chicken/vegetable bouillon (bulion) base vegetable soup
- Zupa migdałowa – almond soup - this is a very old traditional Christmas dish
- Zupa "Nic" – "Nothing" soup, sweet soup made with milk, vanilla and crackers
- Zupa ogórkowa – soup of sour salted cucumbers, often with pork ("dill pickle soup")
- Zupa pomidorowa – tomato soup usually served with pasta or rice
- Zupa szczawiowa – sorrel (szczaw) soup
- Żur or żurek – soured rye soup with sausage and/or hard-boiled egg, sometimes with mushrooms, name often used interchangeably with white barszcz

== Main course ==
- Baranina – roasted or grilled mutton
- Bigos – "hunter stew" of cabbage and a variety of cheap cuts of meat with bone and fat, smoked sausage (kiełbasa), wild mushrooms, bay leaf, and sometimes black pepper
- Christmas carp – fish dish traditionally eaten on Christmas Eve throughout Central Europe
- Gołąbki – cabbage leaves stuffed with spiced minced meat and rice or with mushrooms and rice, often in a tomato base
- Golonka – stewed pork knuckle or hock
- Gulasz – stew of meat, noodles and vegetables (especially potato), seasoned with paprika and other spices
- Kaczka z jabłkami – roast duck with apples
- Karkówka – chuck steak, usually roasted
- Kasza gryczana ze skwarkami – buckwheat groats with chopped, fried lard and onions
- Kaszanka – Polish blood sausage, made of pork blood, liver, lungs and fat with kasza, spiced with onion, pepper and marjoram
- Kołacz or korowaj – traditional sweet breads, also known as yeast cakes, customarily served at weddings
- Kiełbasa – sausage, a staple of Polish cuisine that comes in dozens of varieties, smoked or fresh, made with pork, beef, turkey, lamb, or veal with every region having its own specialty
- Kiszka ziemniaczana – type of roasted sausage made of minced potatoes
- Klopsiki – or pulpety, meatballs, often with tomato sauce
- Kotlet mielony – minced meat cutlet with eggs, bread crumbs, garlic, and salt and pepper rolled into a ball and fried with onions and butter
- Kotlet schabowy – pork breaded cutlet; made of pork tenderloin (with the bone or without), or of pork chop. Kotlet z piersi Kurczaka is a Polish variety of chicken cutlet coated with breadcrumbs. Kotlet z Indyka is a turkey cutlet coated with breadcrumbs, served with boiled potatoes and cabbage stew.
- Kurczak pieczony po wiejsku – Polish village style roasted chicken with onion, garlic and smoked bacon
- Łosoś – salmon, often baked or boiled in a dill sauce
- Pampuchy – type of pączek from yeast dough cooked on steam
- Pasztecik szczeciński – deep-fried yeast dough stuffed with meat or vegetarian filling, served in specialized bars as a fast food, different from Polish home-cuisine dishes, which also are called "pasztecik"
- Pieczeń cielęca – roast veal, marinated in an aromatic marinade
- Pieczeń wieprzowa z winem – pork roast with wine
- Pieczeń z mięsa mielonego – ground meat roast
- Pierogi – dumplings, usually filled with sauerkraut and/or mushrooms, meat, potato and/or savory cheese, sweet curd cheese with a touch of vanilla, or blueberries or other fruits, such as cherries or strawberries, and sometimes even apples—optionally topped with sour cream and/or sugar for the sweet versions.
- Placki ziemniaczane (placki kartoflane) – potato pancakes usually served with sour cream
- Polędwiczki wołowe – beef sirloin, often with rare mushroom sauce
- Pyzy – potato dumplings served by themselves or stuffed with minced meat or cottage cheese
- Rolada z kurczakiem i pieczarkami – roulade of chicken and mushrooms
- Rolada z mięsa mielonego z pieczarkami – ground meat roulade stuffed with mushrooms
- Ryba smażona – fried, breaded fish fillet
- Schab faszerowany – stuffed pork loin
- Wołowina pieczona – roast beef
- Zapiekanka – short baguette, cut in two slices, topped with tomato sauce and briefly fried mushrooms and onion, then topped with grated cheese and briefly roasted, served hot with ketchup or/and mayonnaise topping, sold as a takeaway dish
- Zrazy – twisted shape thin slices of chopped beef, which is flavored with salt and pepper and stuffed with vegetables, mushrooms, eggs, and potato
- Zrazy zawijane – beef rolls stuffed with bacon, pickle and onion
- Żeberka wędzone – smoked, roasted or grilled ribs

== Side dishes ==
- Ćwikła z chrzanem – grated or finely chopped beetroot mixed with chrain
- Fasolka z migdałami – fresh slender snipped green beans steamed and topped with butter, bread crumbs, and toasted almond slices
- Kapusta kiszona – sauerkraut
- Kapusta zasmażana – sauerkraut pan-fried with fried onions, cooked pork, whole pepper, and rich spices; a truly hearty side dish
- Kapusta z grochem – peas, sauerkraut and spices
- Kartofle gotowane – simple boiled potatoes with parsley or dill
- Kasza gryczana – buckwheat groats
- Kopytka – hoof-shaped potato dumplings
- Mizeria – traditional Polish salad made from thinly sliced cucumbers and sour cream, seasoned with salt, pepper and occasionally sugar
- Ogórek kiszony – dill pickle
- Ogórek konserwowy – preserved cucumber which is rather sweet and vinegary in taste
- Pieczarki marynowane – marinated mushrooms
- Sałatka – vegetable salad lettuce, tomato, cucumber or pickled cucumber; it is optional to add very small amount of white vinegar, heavy cream, mayonnaise or other dressings
- Sałatka burakowa (buraczki) – finely chopped warm beetroot salad
- Sałatka ogórkowa – pickled cucumber, preserved cucumber, chopped red peppers, onions salad
- Sałatka warzywna (sałatka jarzynowa) – vegetable salad, a traditional Polish side dish with cooked and finely chopped root vegetables, potato, carrot, parsley root, celery root, combined with chopped pickled or dill cucumbers and hard-boiled eggs in mayonnaise and mustard sauce. Also made with carrots, red paprika, maize, red beans, peas, potatoes, pickled cucumbers, onion, eggs, sausages, mayonnaise, mustard, salt and pepper.
- Sałatka wiosenna – spring salad chopped finely, radishes, green onions, pencil-thin asparagus, peas, hard-cooked eggs or cubed yellow cheese, mayonnaise, salt and pepper, sweet paprika for color
- Sałatka z boczkiem – wilted lettuce salad is made with romaine or iceberg lettuce, chopped hard-cooked eggs, finely chopped onion, vinegar, bacon cut into 1/2-inch pieces, water, sugar, salt and pepper
- Sałatka z kartofli (sałatka ziemniaczana) – potato salad made with red or white potatoes cooked in their jackets, cooled, peeled and cut into 1/4-inch dice, carrots, celery, onion, dill pickles, mayonnaise, sugar, salt and pepper
- Śmietana – whipping cream
- Surówka – raw sauerkraut, apple, carrot, and onion salad
- Surówka z białej kapusty – coleslaw blend of freshly shredded cabbage, carrots, mayonnaise and spices
- Surówka z marchewki – carrot salad made with coarsely grated carrots, coarsely grated granny smith apple, lemon juice, vegetable oil, salt, and sugar
- Tłuczone ziemniaki – mashed potatoes

== Beverages ==
- Beer (piwo) – popular brand names include Żywiec, Tyskie, Warka, Lech, Okocim, Piast, Łomża, Perła, Leżajsk, Żubr
- Cider (cydr)
- Coffee (kawa)
- Garlic milk ("mleko czosnkowe") – warm milk with honey and garlic mixed in
- Herbal tea (herbata ziołowa/herbatka ziołowa)
- Kefir – fermented milk beverage, popular as a drink served at breakfast, lunch, and dinner; Poland is the world's second largest producer of kefir
- Kompot – clear juice obtained by cooking fruit in a large volume of water, like strawberries, apricots, peaches, apples, rhubarb, gooseberries, or sour cherries
- Kvass (Polish: kwas chlebowy) – a fermented drink made from dark rye bread, sugar, and yeast; traditionally universal, especially among the peasantry, it gradually became less popular throughout the 20th century until making a comeback in the 21st century
- Mead (miód pitny)
- Mineral water (woda mineralna)
- Nalewka – home-made, vodka-based liqueur-style drinks
- Soft drink (oranżada)
- Tea (herbata)
- Vodka (Polish: wódka) – since the 8th century. In the 11th century they were called gorzalka and originally used as medicines. The world's first written mention of the drink and the word "vodka" was in 1405 from Akta Grodzkie, the court documents from the Palatinate of Sandomierz in Poland. It is traditionally drunk with a 50- to 100-milliliter glass (shot glass). Popular brand names include Belvedere, Chopin, Sobieski, Luksusowa, Absolwent, Żubrówka, Wyborowa, Biała Dama, Polonaise, Żołądkowa Gorzka, Starka, Krupnik, Siwucha and Ultimat.
- Wine (wino)
- Wściekły pies (mad dog) – shot drink made from vodka, raspberry or blackcurrant syrup, and Tabasco sauce

== Desserts ==
- Budyń – kind of custard pudding (made with a starch instead of egg yolk); usually comes in many different flavors, such as vanilla, chocolate, banana or cherry
- Chałka – sweet white wheat bread from Jewish cuisine
- Faworki (chrusty) – light fried pastry covered with icing sugar
- Kisiel – juicy pudding made with pure fruit juice thickened with starch
- Krówki – Polish fudge, soft milk toffee candies
- Kutia – small square pasta or wheat with poppy seeds, nuts, raisins and honey; typically served during Christmas in the eastern regions (Białystok)
- Makaron z truskawkami – cooked pasta with strawberry and cream sauce
- Makowiec – poppy seed-swirl cake, sometimes with raisins and/or nuts
- Mazurek – cake baked in Poland, particularly at Christmas Eve and Easter, but also at other winter holidays
- Naleśniki – crepes which are either folded into triangles or rolled into a tube typical servings include sweetened quark fresh cheese with sour cream and sugar, various fruits topped with bita śmietana (whipped cream) or with bite bialka (whipped egg whites)
- Pączek – closed donut filled with rose marmalade or other fruit conserves
- Pańska skórka – taffy sold at cemeteries during Zaduszki and at Stare Miasto (Old city) in Warsaw
- Pierniki – soft gingerbread shapes iced or filled with marmalade of different fruit flavours and covered with chocolate
- Sernik – Sernik (cheesecake) is one of the most popular desserts in Poland; made primarily of twaróg, a type of quark fresh cheese
- Szarlotka or jabłecznik – Polish apple cake
- Tort – multi-layered sponge cake filled with buttercream or whippedcream, with fruits or nuts, served on special occasions like nameday or birthday
- Twaróg – type of fresh cheese/quark

== Folk medicine ==
- Herbata góralska ("Goral tea") or herbata z prądem ("tea with electricity") – tea with alcohol
- Syrop z cebuli ("onion syrup") – cough remedy made of chopped onion and sugar; it is still considered a medicine
- Syrop z buraka ("beetroot syrup") – cough remedy made of chopped beetroot and sugar;
- Tran – cod liver oil used like a vitamin

== Regional cuisine ==
A list of dishes popular in certain regions of Poland:

=== Greater Poland ===
- Gzik (gzika) – Quark with sour cream, diced European radishes (Raphanus sativus) and diced green onions or chives. In recent years a variant using garlic instead of radishes has become a restaurant staple.
- Kaczka z pyzami i modrą kapustą – roast duck with steam-cooked rolls and red cabbage
- Kiszczonka – black pudding soup
- Kopytka – potato dumplings
- Makiełki – traditional Christmas Eve dessert; its main ingredients are gingerbread extract, nuts and dried fruit, strawberry compote and almonds
- Plendze – potato pancakes served with sugar
- Pyry z gzikiem – boiled, peeled or unpeeled potatoes with gzik and butter
- Rogale świętomarcińskie – croissants filled with white poppy seeds, almonds, other nuts and raisins, traditionally eaten on November 11, St. Martin's Day

=== Lesser Poland ===
- Strudel jabłkowy – apple strudel (cake), identical to the Austrian apfelstrudel
- Karkówka – tenderloin, usually roasted
- Kiełbasa – krakowska, podwawelska
- Makowiec – poppy seed cake
- Miodek turecki – caramelised sugar, traditionally with nuts
- Pischinger chocolate oblaten cake – cake made of layers of wafer and layer
- Proziaki – Polish flat soda bread
- Przysmak piwny – beef jerky

==== Goral Lands ====
- Bryjka also known as klózki- boiled flour or ground up kasha served with milk or spyrka (fried słonina)
- Bryndza – cheese
- Bundz – cheese
- Czosnianka – garlic and mint soup
- Gołka – cheese
- Kwaśnica – sauerkraut and potato soup
- Oscypek – hard, salty cheese from non-pasteurized sheep milk which is smoked over a fire; sometimes served sliced and fried with cranberries
- Śliwowica łącka – strong plum brandy (70% alcohol)
- Zyntyca – popular drink made of sheep's milk whey
- Moskole - potato flatbread
- Placek po zbójnicku - potato pancakes with goulash
- Kołacz z serem - round sweet bread with cheese, either twaróg or bryndza
- Pstrąg - trout fish, usually fried
- Góralska herbata (Goral tea) - tea with vodka and raspberry syrup)
- Bombolki - sweet cakes covered in honey

=== Lublin Land ===
- Biłgoraj pierogi – regional pâté/pie from Biłgoraj, based on potatoes, quark and buckwheat groats (kasha)
- Cebularz – Jewish wheat flat-cake, topped with onion and poppy-seed
- Forszmak – appetizer with salty minced fish and meat
- Kaszak – bread roll filled with Biłgoraj pierogi
- Marchwiak – in appearance similar to a Swiss roll, filled with a carrot filling
- Ruthenian pierogi, pierogi ruskie – most stuffed with twaróg and potato
- Pierogi z bobem – pierogi stuffed with broad bean

=== Masovia ===
- Baba warszawska – yeast cake
- Bułka z pieczarkami – a bun filled with a champignon (field mushroom) stew; ersatz hot dogs under communism, when frankfurters were in short supply
- Flaczki z pulpetami (po warszawsku) – tripe stew with marjoram and small meat noodles
- Kawior po żydowsku – "Jewish caviar"; chopped calf or poultry liver with garlic and hard boiled egg
- Kugiel – found in the town of Ostrołęka, made with potatoes and diced meat
- Nalesniki – pancakes filled with sweet white cheese
- Pączki – doughnuts with rose marmalade
- Pyzy z mięsem – round potato dumplings stuffed with meat
- Zrazy wołowe – rolled beef strips in sauce
- Zrazy wołowe zawijane – chopped dill cucumbers and onions wrapped in thin strips of beef
- Zupa grzybowa po kurpiowsku (z gąsek) – mushroom soup made of Tricholoma equestre (pol. gąska), a large mushroom with a cereal-like flavor

=== Masuria ===
- Kartacz – see #Podlaskie
- Sękacz – pyramid cake, made of many layers

=== Opole Silesia ===
- Ciapkapusta, pańczkraut, pańćkraut – potato, cabbage pureé dish
- Biołe kluski – potato dumplings with a small depression in the centre
- Śląskie niebo – bacon with kluski and sauce, generally with vegetables

=== Podlaskie ===
- Babka ziemniaczana
- Babka żółtkowa – yolk and yeast cake
- Bliny gryczane – buckwheat pancakes
- Cebulniaczki
- Cepeliny – big, long potato dumplings stuffed with meat and marjoram
- Chleb biebrzański
- Chłodnik – cold soup made of soured milk, young beet leaves, beets, cucumbers and chopped fresh dill
- Grzyby po żmudzku – mushrooms, Samogitian style
- Kartacz – big, long potato dumplings stuffed with meat and marjoram
- Kawior z bakłażana – "caviar" of eggplant
- Kiszka ziemniaczana – potato sausage
- Kopytka – potato dumplings with fried onions
- Korycinski – cheese
- Kreple z lejka
- Kugiel ze skwarkami
- Kutia – traditional Christmas dish, made of wheat, poppy seeds, nuts, raisins and honey
- Melszpejz zaparzany z jabłek
- Okoń smażony, w zalewie octowej – perch fried in vinegar
- Pieczeń wiedźmy
- Ruskie pierogi – Ruthenian style pierogi with quark cheese and potato
- Sękacz – pyramid cake, made of many layers
- Szodo
- Tort ziemniaczany – potato cake
- Żeberka wieprzowe po żmudzku – pork ribs, Samogitian style
- Zrazy wołyńskie
- Zucielki

=== Pomerania ===
- Pierniki – soft gingerbread shapes filled with marmalade of different fruit flavours and covered with chocolate
- Ruchanki – flat, oval racuszki hot fried on fat
- Szpekucha – small dumplings stuffed with lard and fried onion

=== Świętokrzyskie ===
- Dzionie rakowskie – kaszanka made from pork or beef intestine, visually similar to kaszanka pâté
- Fitka kazimierska – traditional soup from Kazimierza County; made from potatoes, vegetables, pork rind from fatback, barley kasza and tomato pureé
- Krówka opatowska (Opatów krówka) – milk condensate sweet with a minute vanilla taste; produced since the year 1980
- Prazoki – kluski-like dish made from boiled potatoes and steamed flour, served with fatback and onion
- Słupiański siekaniec dworski – rouladen dish, sliced into c. 1.5 cm wide pieces; includes gentium and groat kasza

=== Western Pomerania ===
- Paprykarz szczeciński – paste made by mixing fish paste with rice, onion, tomato concentrate, vegetable oil, salt and a mixture of spices including chilli pepper powder
- Pasztecik szczeciński – deep-fried yeast dough stuffed with meat or vegetarian filling, a typical fast food dish of Szczecin

=== Silesia ===
- Kluski śląskie (Silesian dumplings) – round dumplings served with gravy, made of mashed boiled potatoes, finely grated raw potatoes, an egg, grated onion, wheat flour and potato starch flour
- Knysza – bread roll with meat and vegetables
- Krupniok – blood sausage made of kasza and animal blood, spiced with marjoram and garlic
- Żymlok - blood sausage similar to Krupniok but made using a bread roll instead of kasza
- Makiełki, moczka, or makówki – traditional Christmas Eve dessert; its main ingredients are gingerbread extract, nuts and dried fruit, strawberry compote and almonds
- Poppy seed pastry – many elaborate recipes are possible; based on finely ground poppy seeds, with raisins, almonds, Candied citrus peels, honey, sugar, pudding flavoured with rum; decorated with fingers of crumbling
- Rolada z modrą kapustą (roladen with red cabbage) – best-quality beef-meat roll; stuffed with pickled vegetable, ham, and good amount of seasoning; always served with red cabbage (with fried bacon, fresh onion and allspice); traditionally eaten with kluski śląskie for Sunday dinner
- Siemieniotka or siemiotka – very original and rare kind of soup made of hemp seed with boiled kasza, one of the main Christmas Eve meals; requires a lot of hand work to prepare according to tradition
- Szałot (Silesian potato salad) – salad made out of cubed boiled potatoes, root vegetables, various sausages (sometimes ham), pickled fish (usually herring), boiled eggs, bound with mayonnaise
- Wodzionka or brołtzupa (German brot, bread; Polish zupa, soup) – soup with garlic and squares of dried rye bread

== Gallery ==
=== Beverages ===
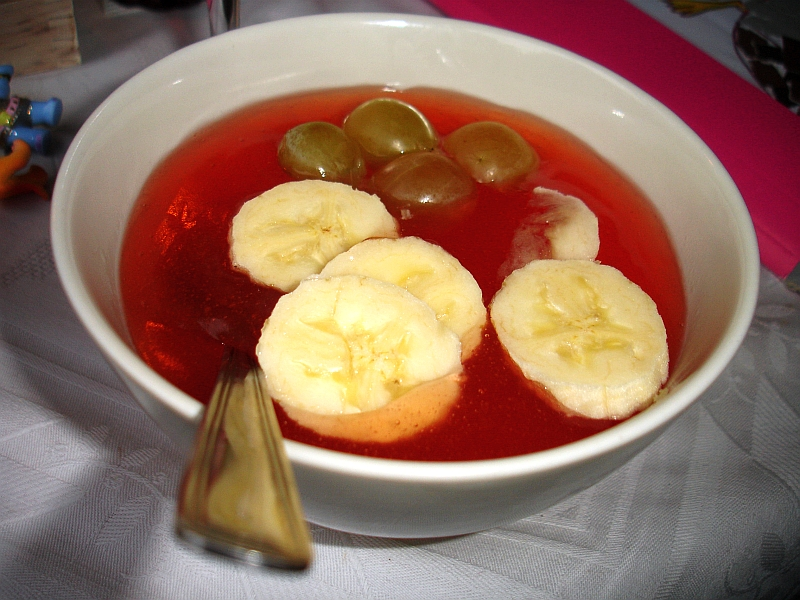
Kisiel, a dessert served with bananas and grapes. When more water added, kisiel can be served as a hot beverage.

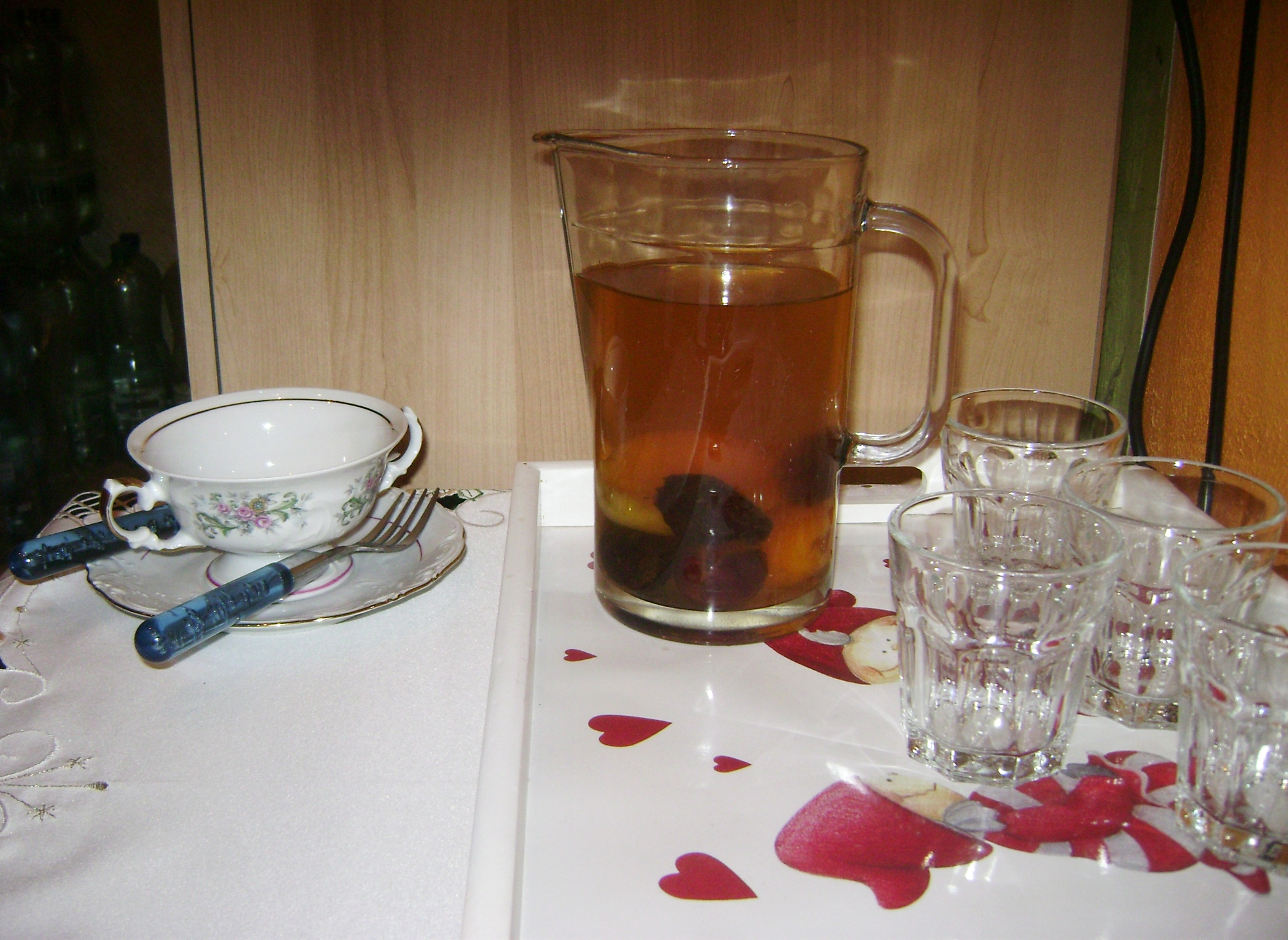
Kompot – a traditional drink of dried fruit

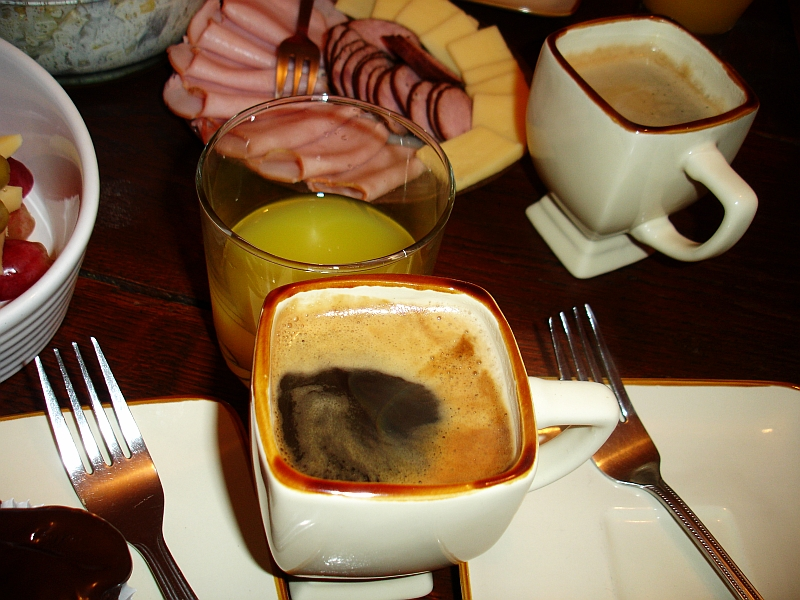
Coffee (kawa)

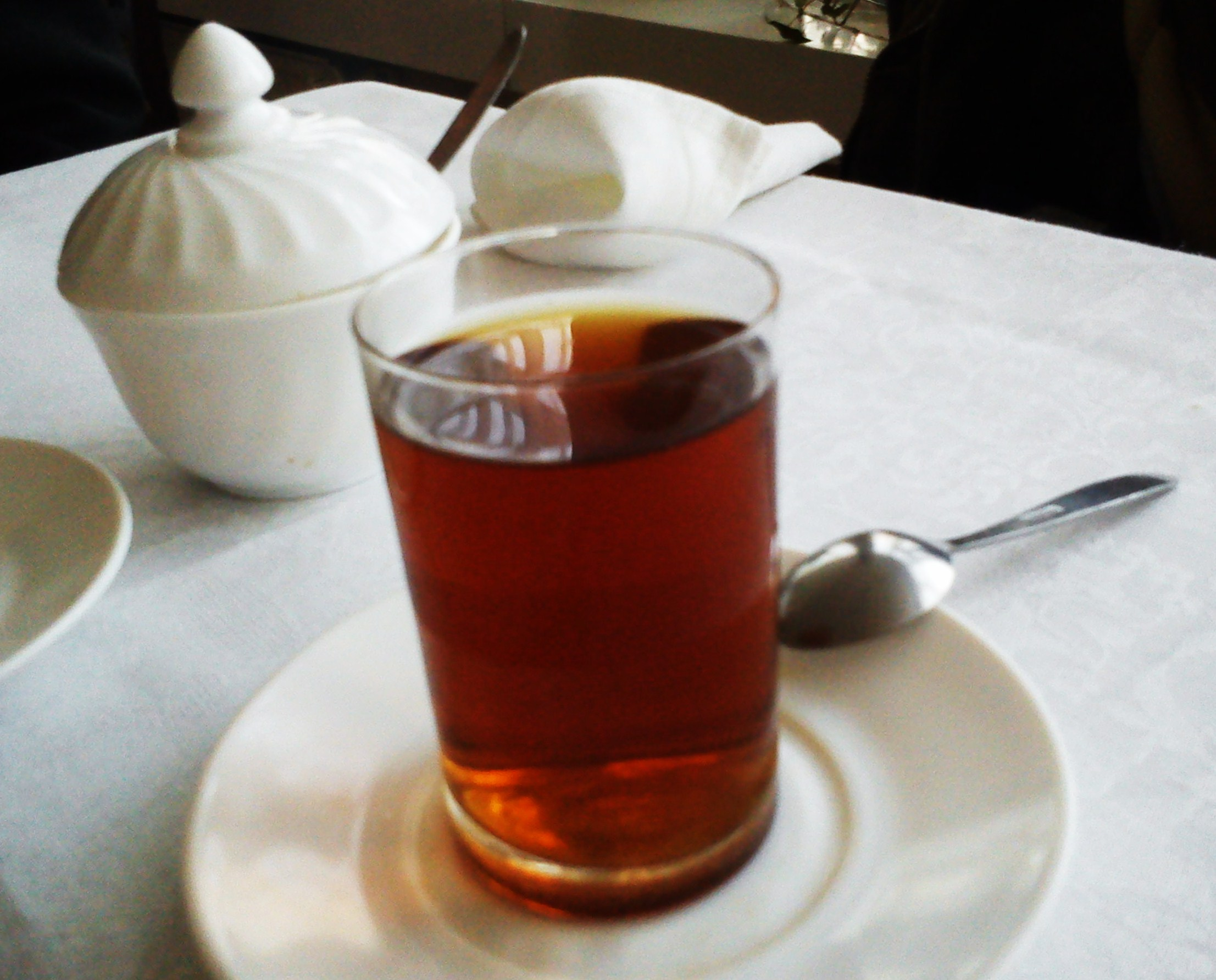
Tea (herbata)

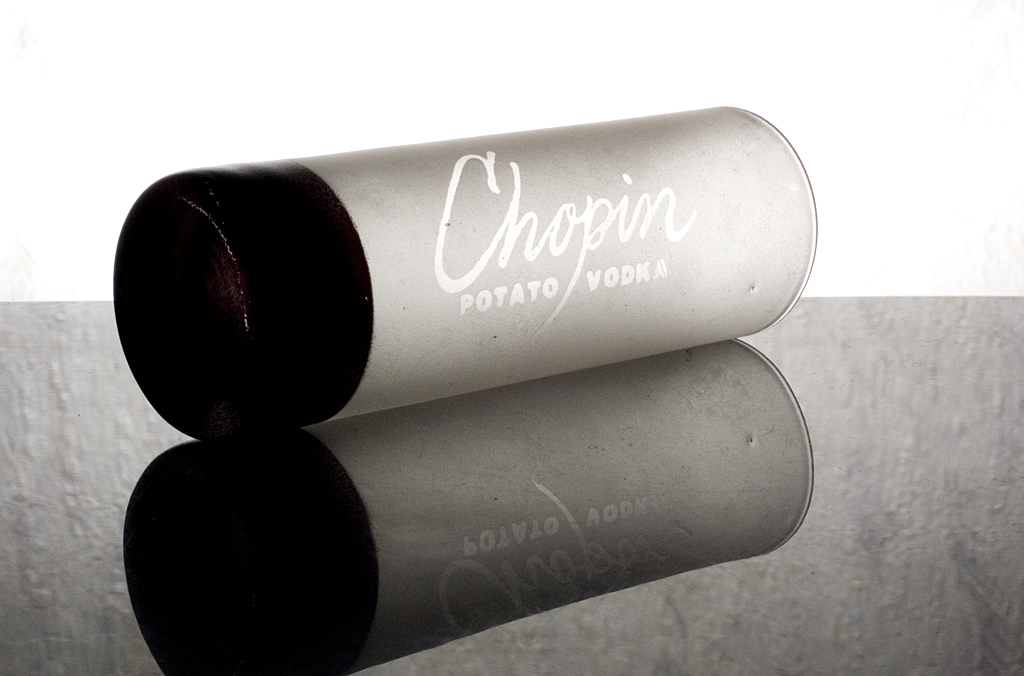
Chopin Vodka

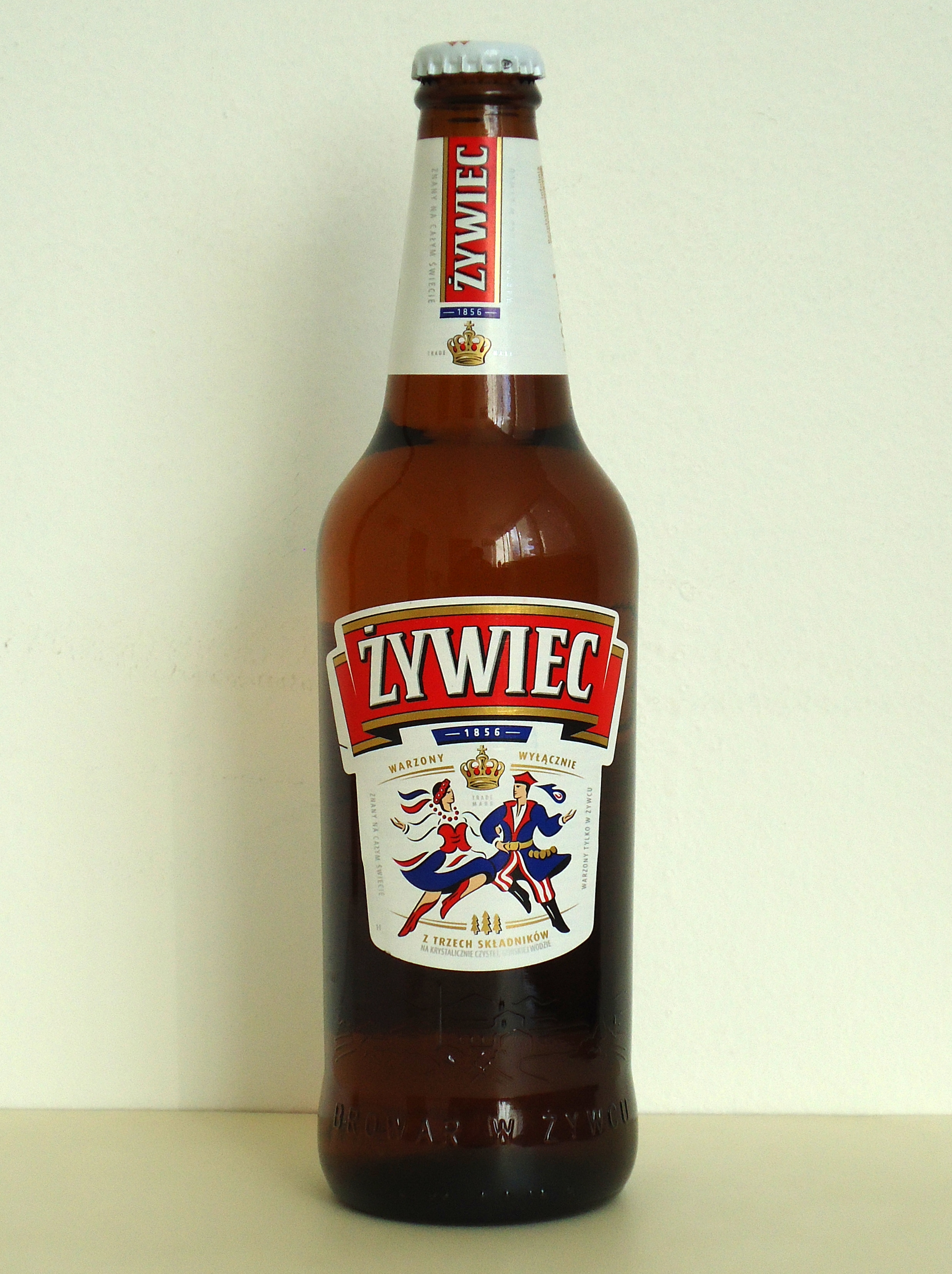
Zywiec Beer

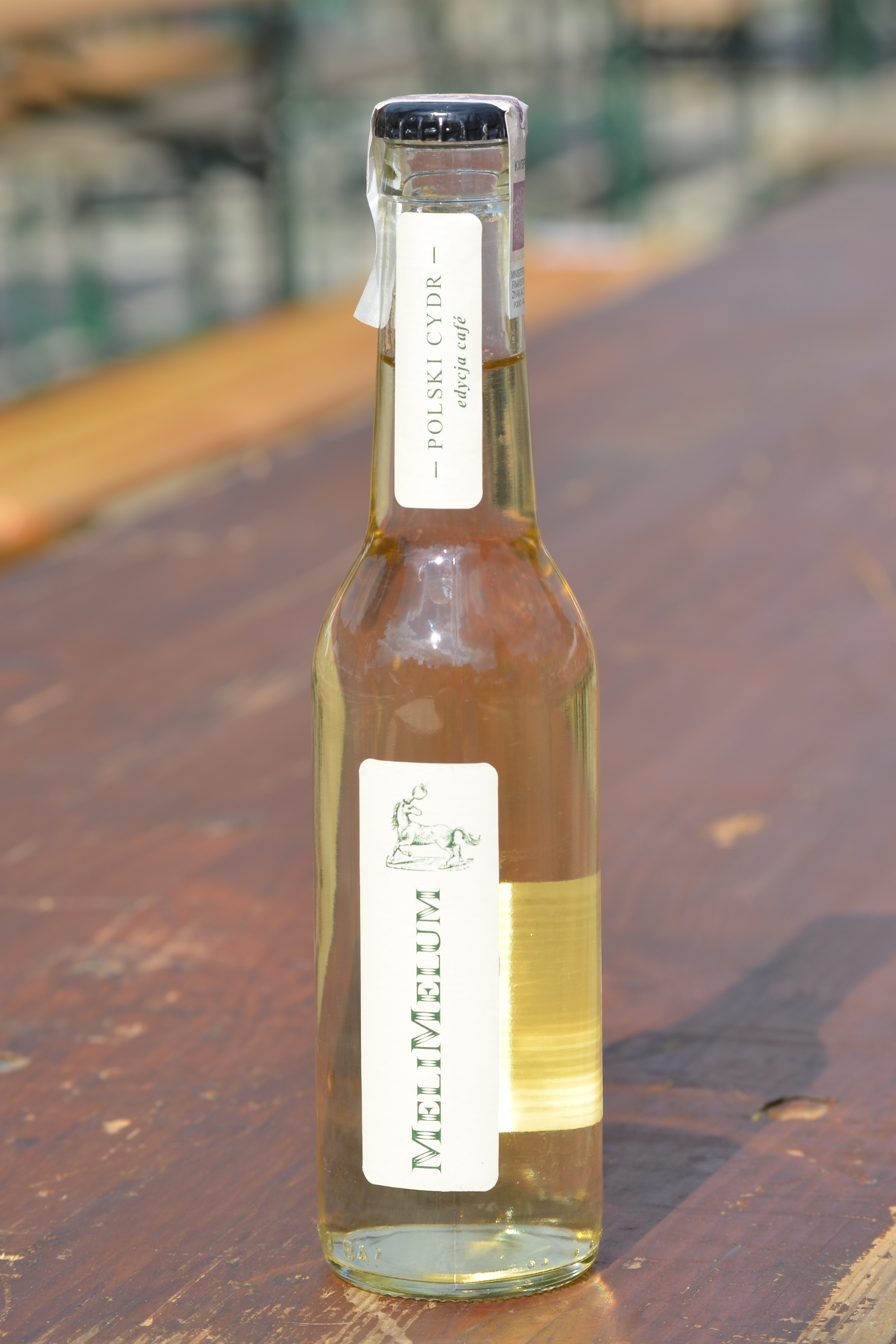
Cider

=== Dairy ===
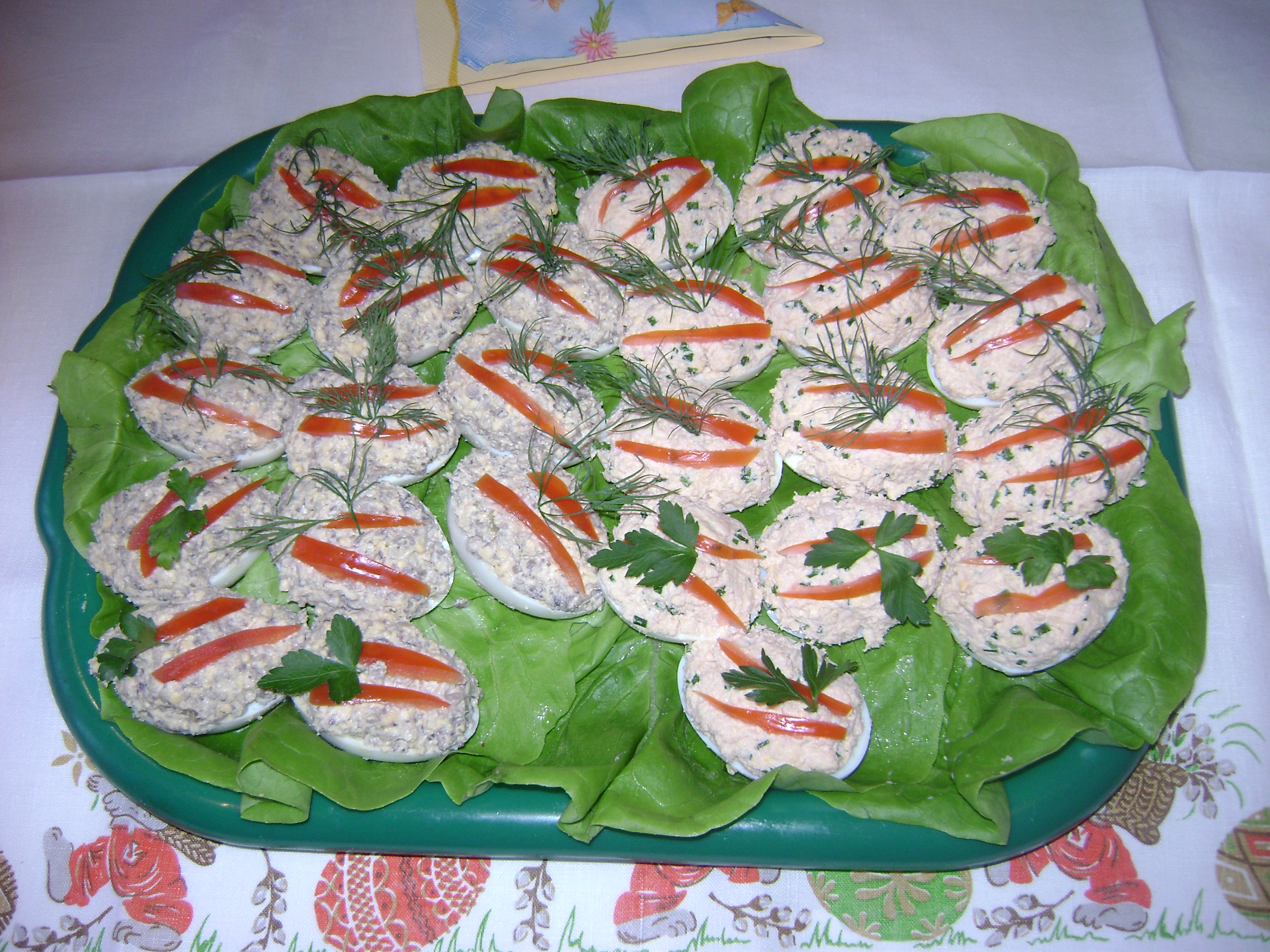
Faszerowane jajka – deviled eggs

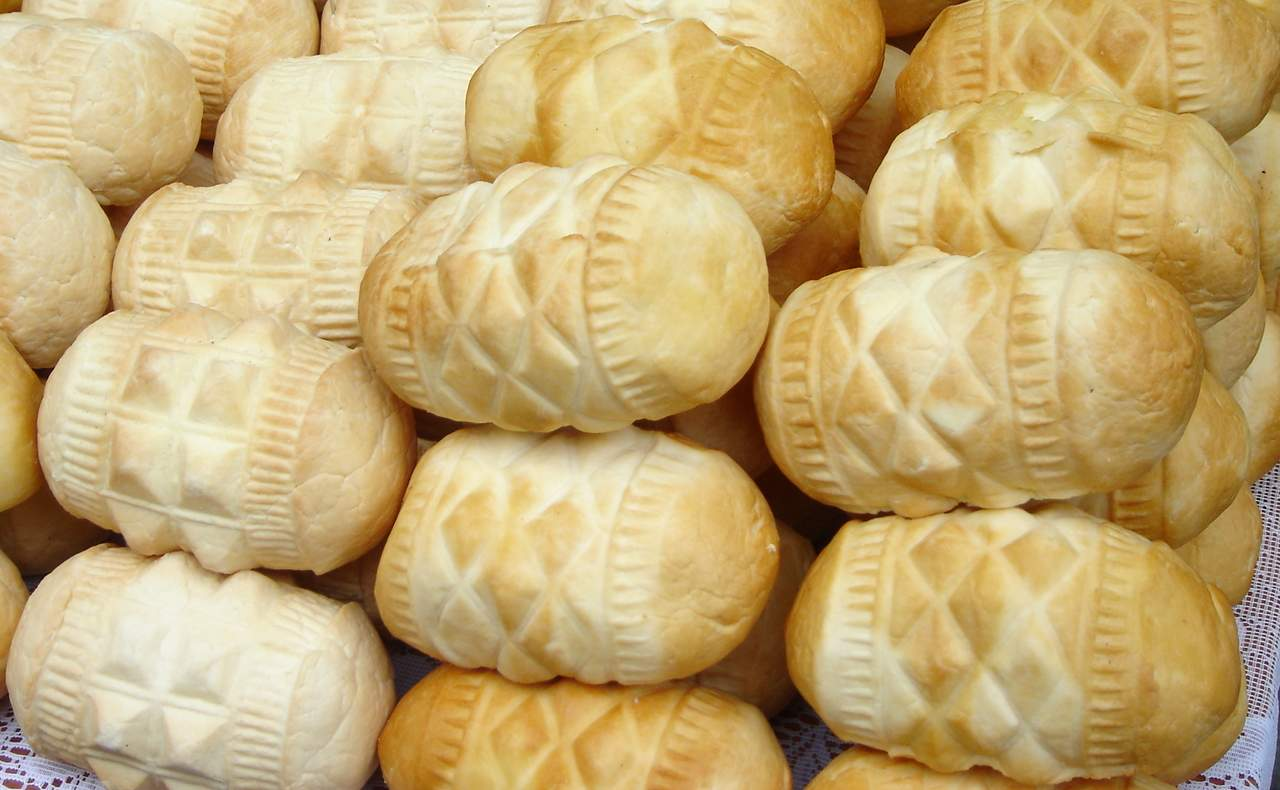
Oscypek

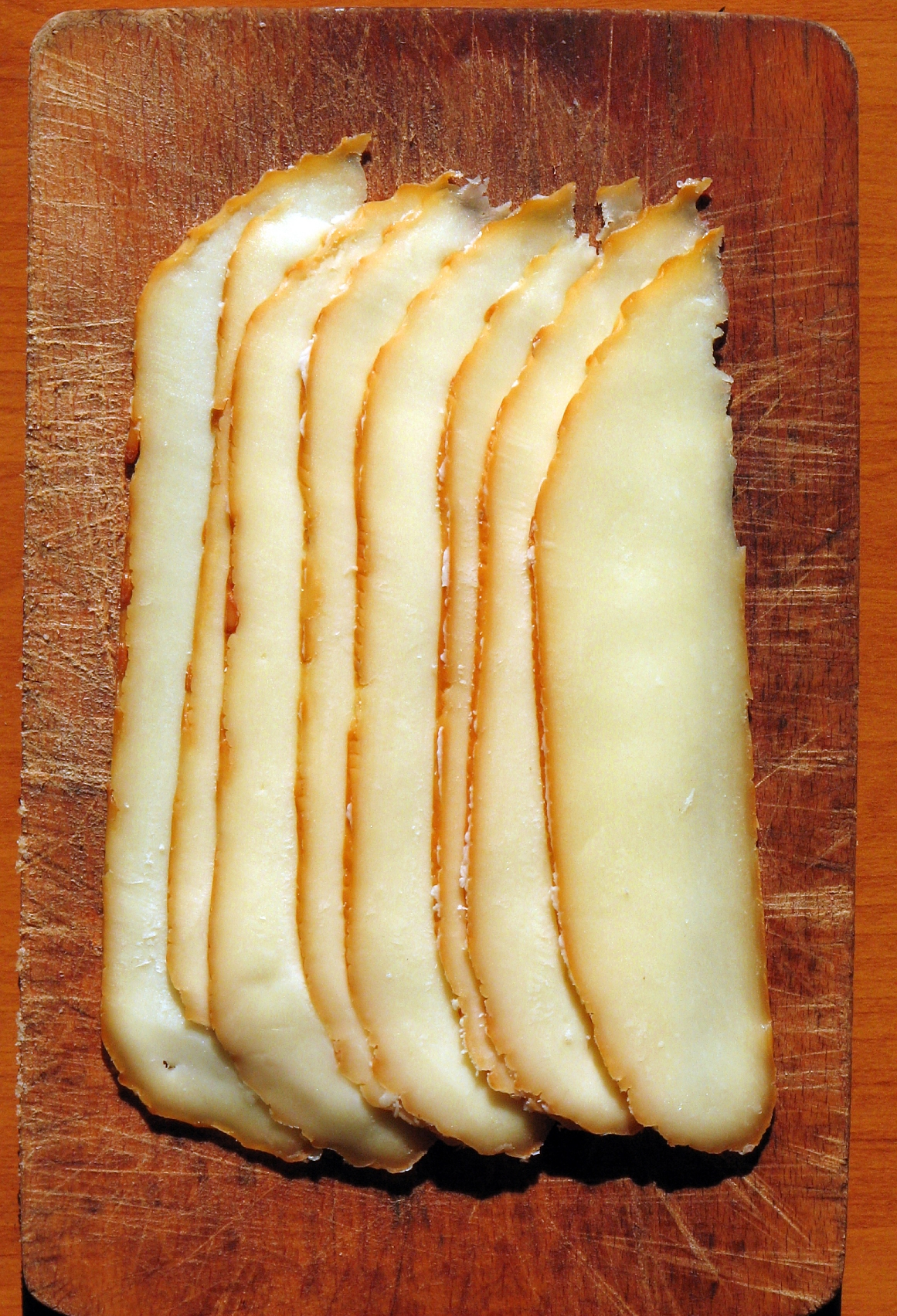
Ser wędzony – smoked cheese

=== Meat and fish ===
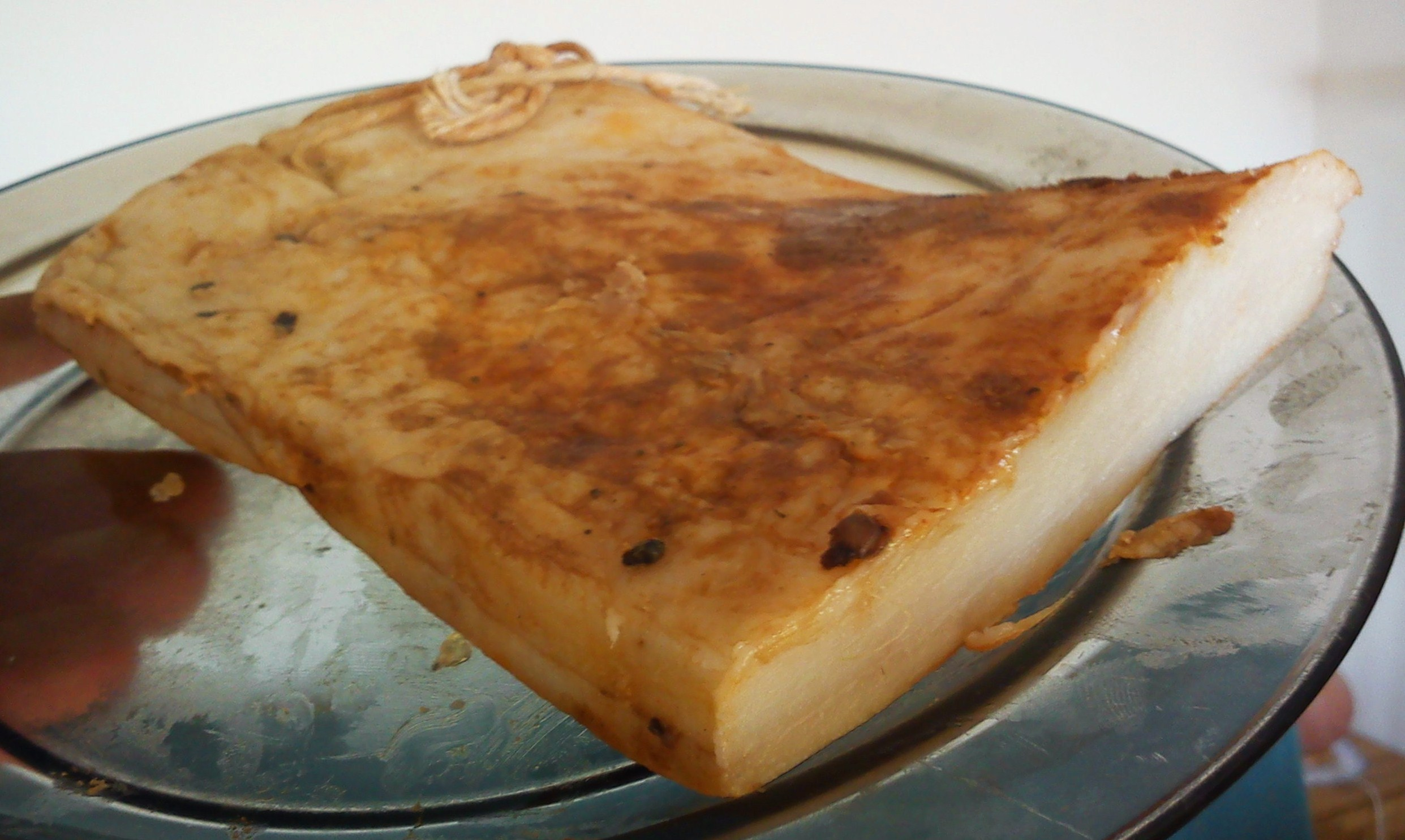
Boczek Słonina – Polish bacon

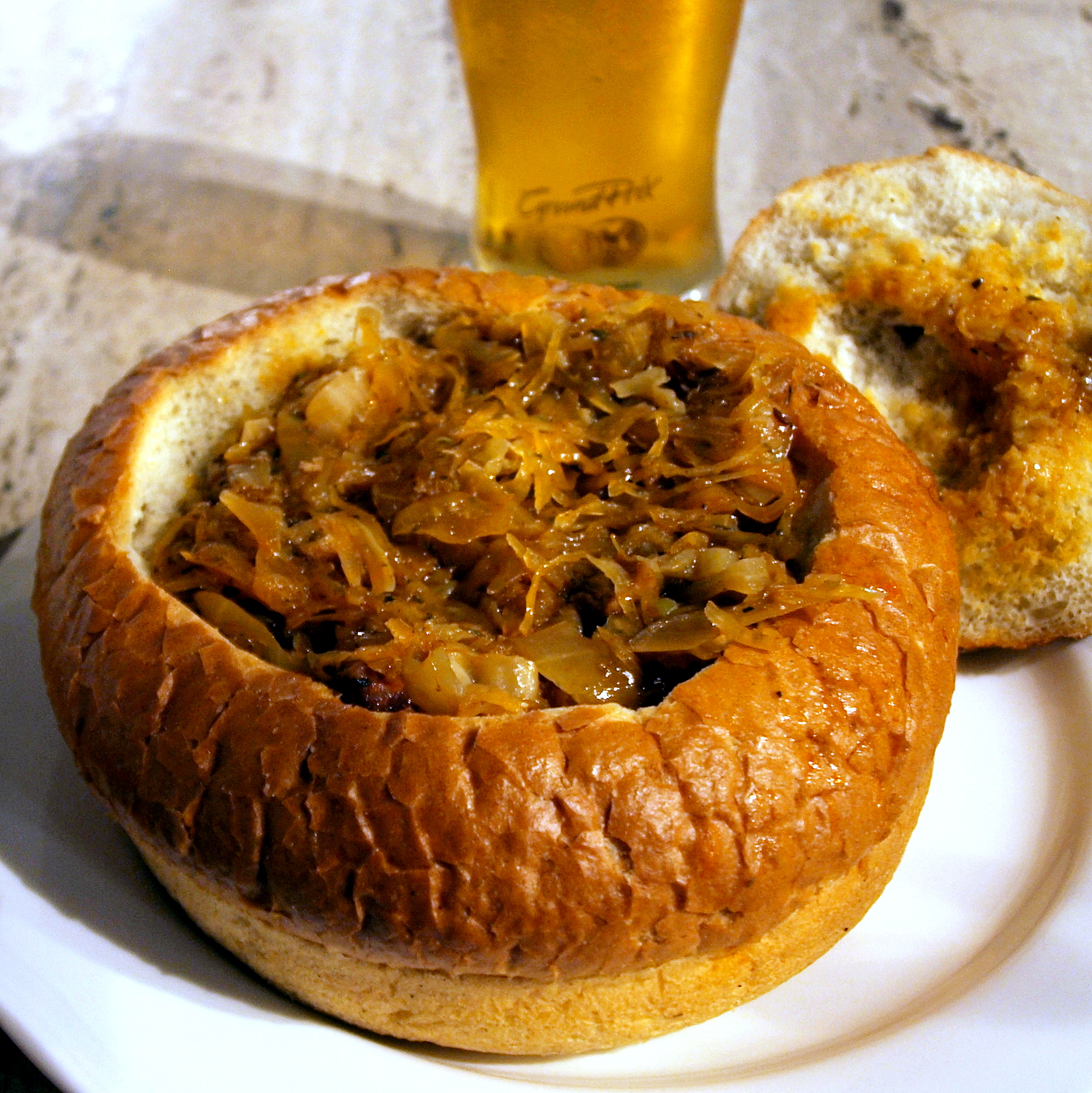
Bigos (hunter's stew) served in a bread bowl with a glass of beer at a restaurant in Kraków

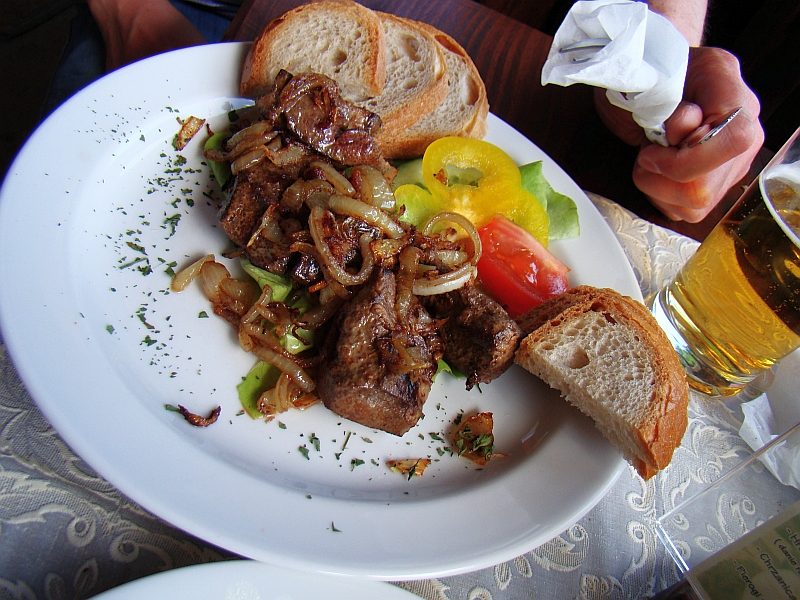
Fried pork liver at a restaurant in Sanok

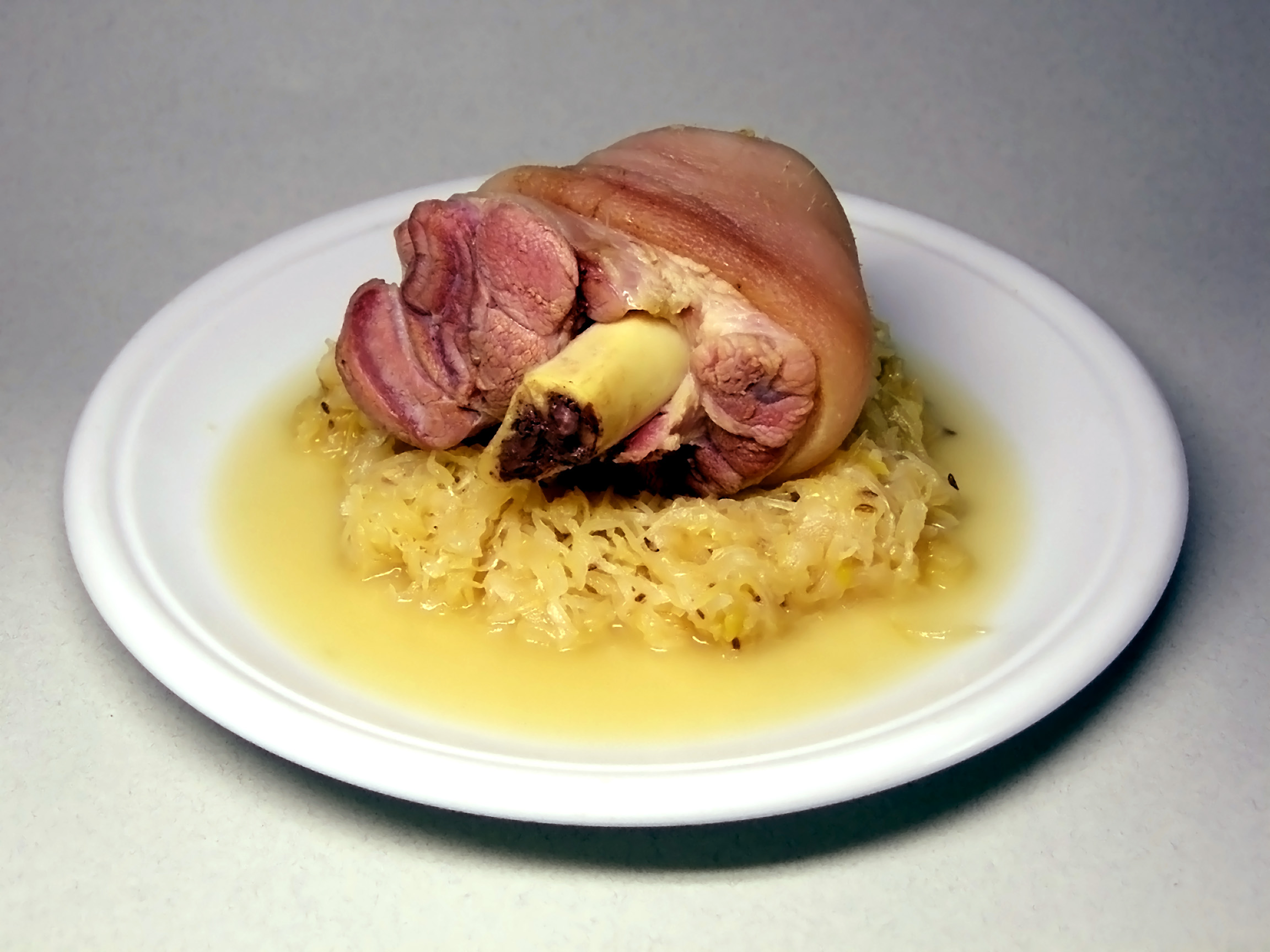
Pickled Golonka, with kapusta

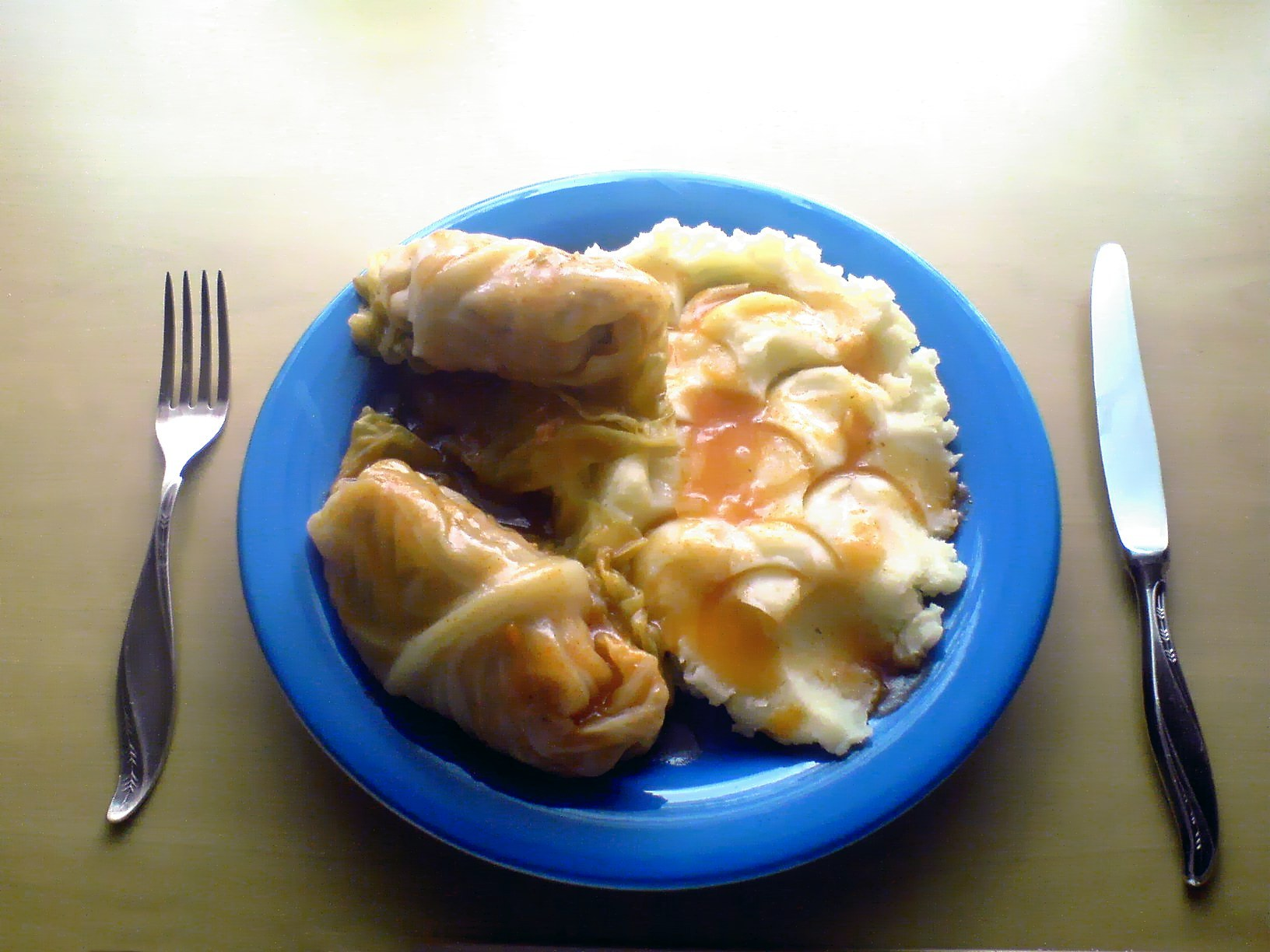
Gołąbki (meat-stuffed cabbage rolls) with mashed potatoes on the side

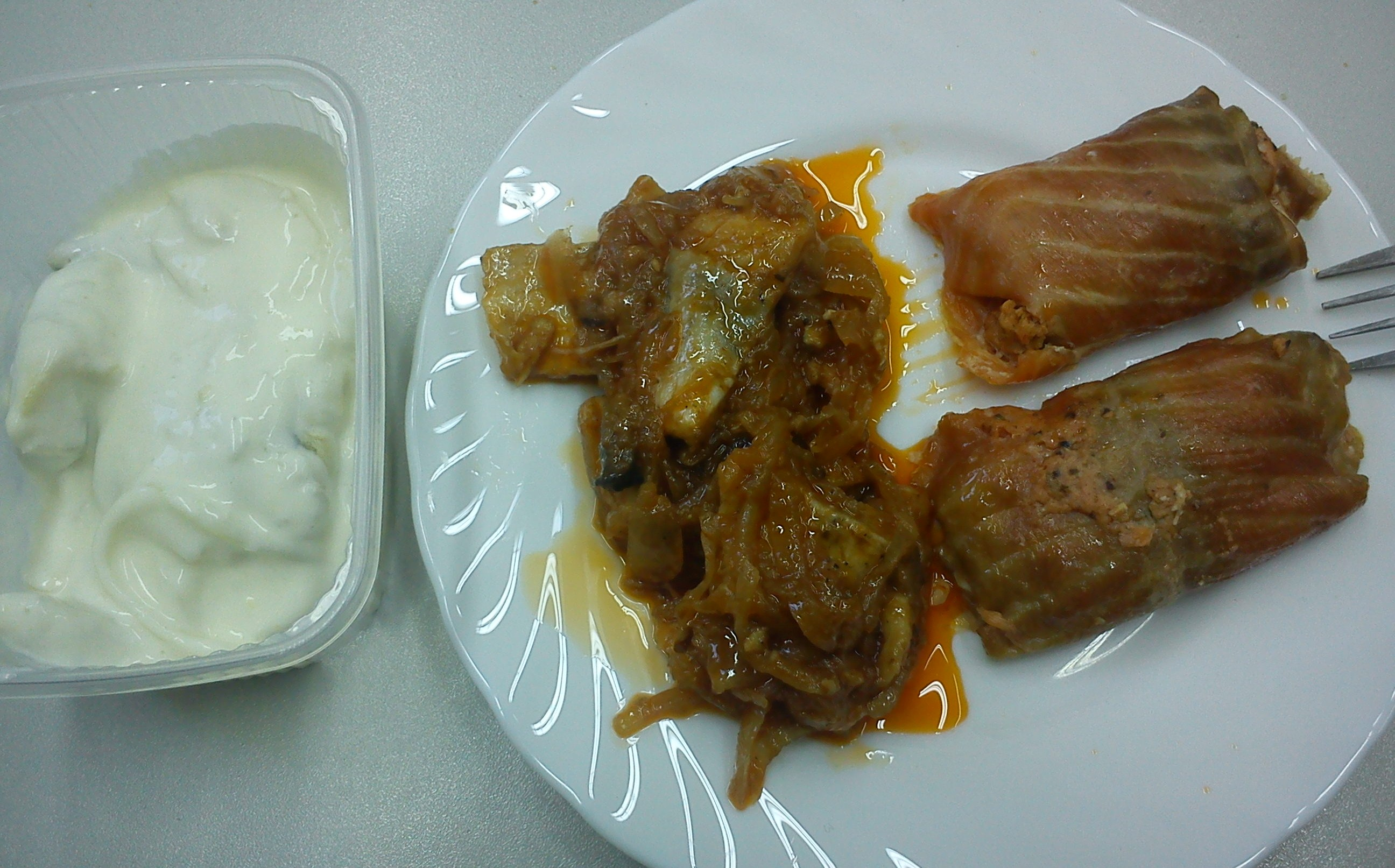
Herring in sour cream, dainty hunter, roulade of salmon

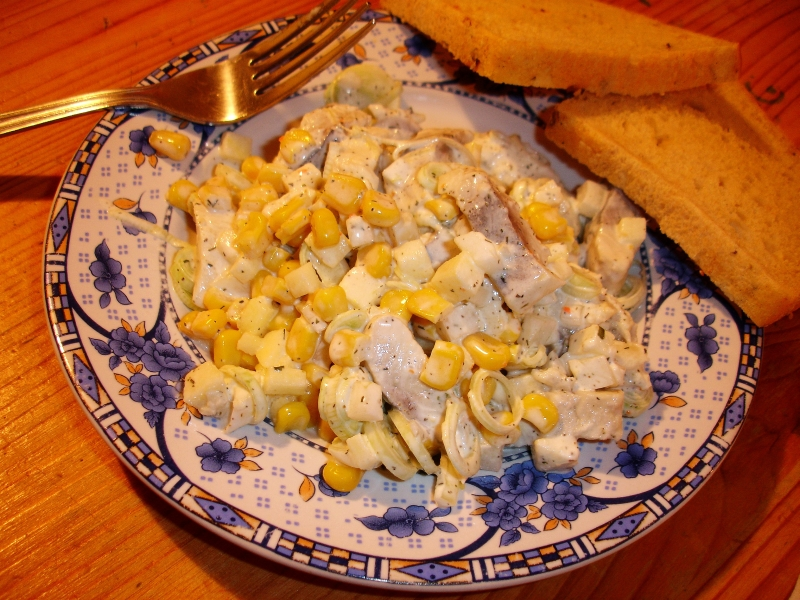
Herring and corn salad

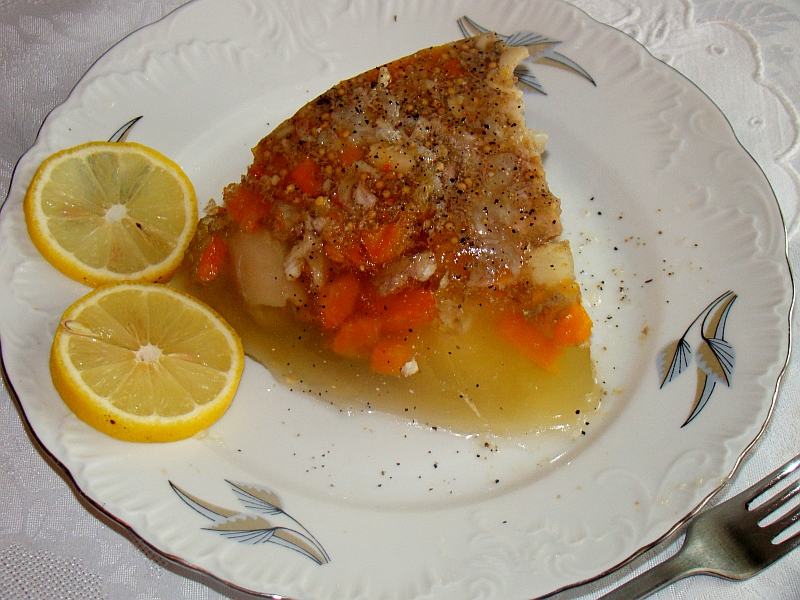
Zimne nóżki – jellied pig's feet

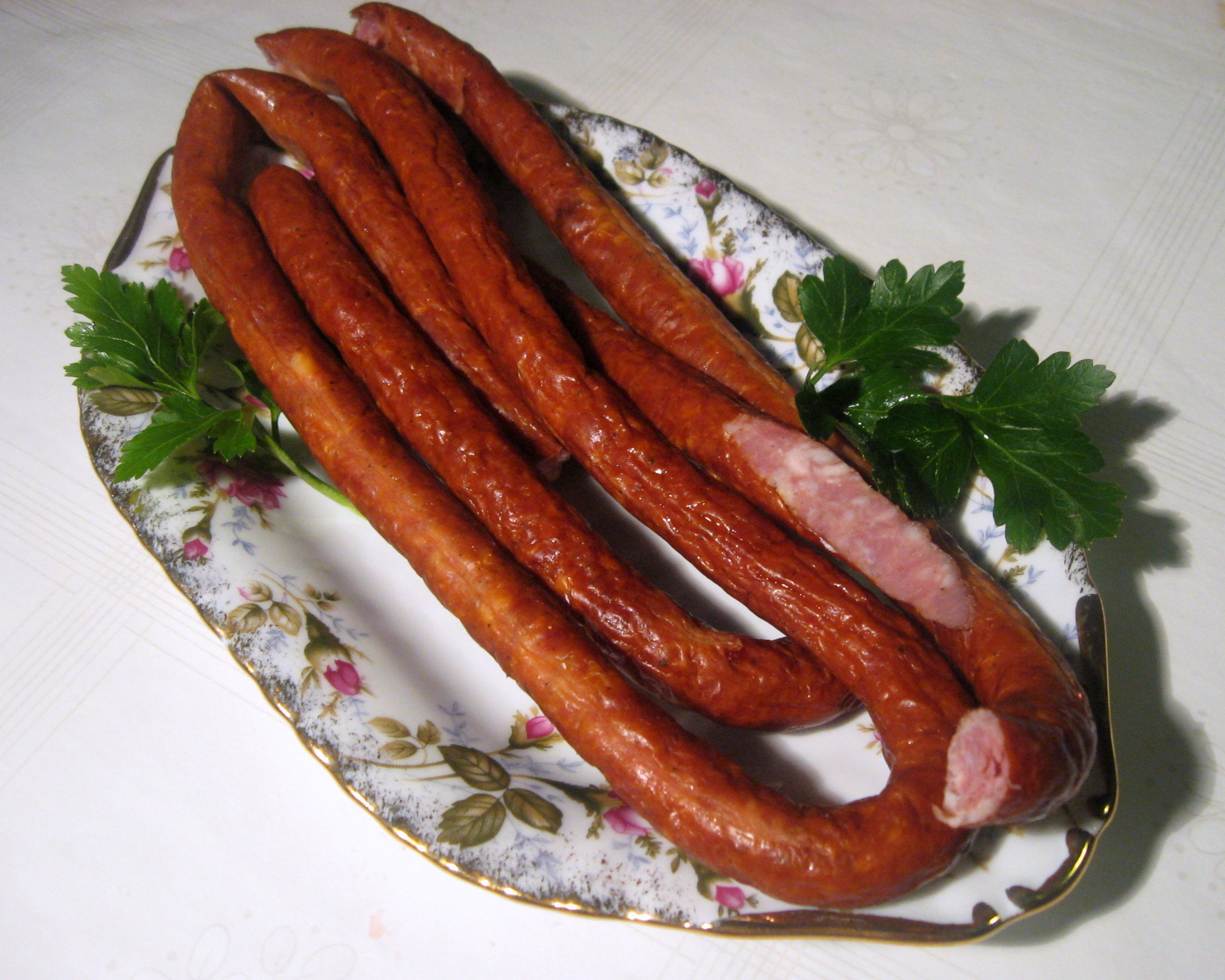
Kabanosy

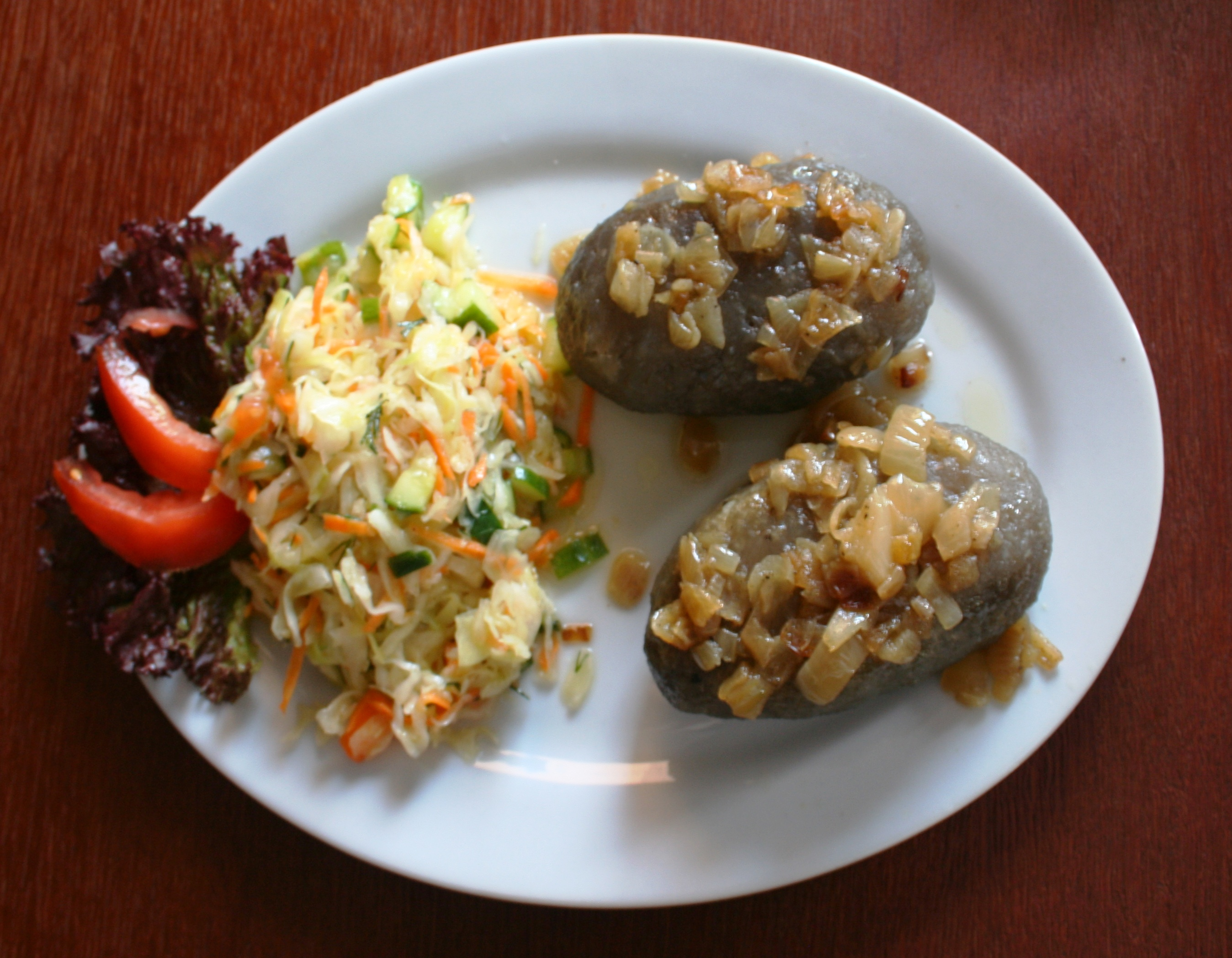
Kartacze z okrasą

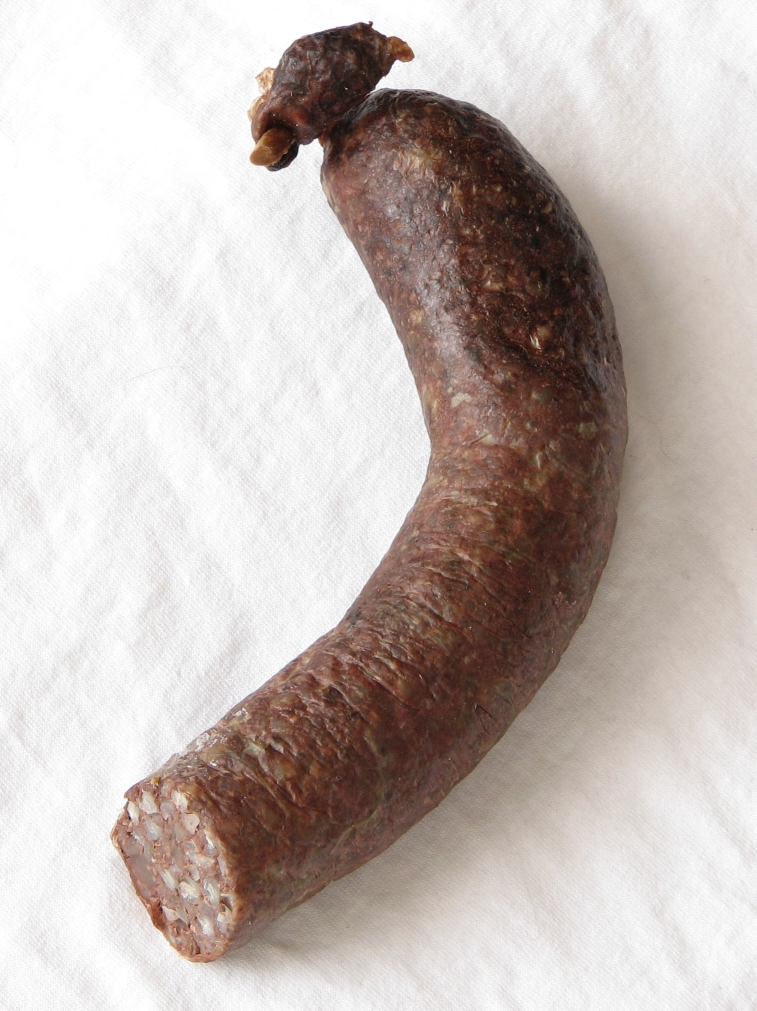
Kaszanka

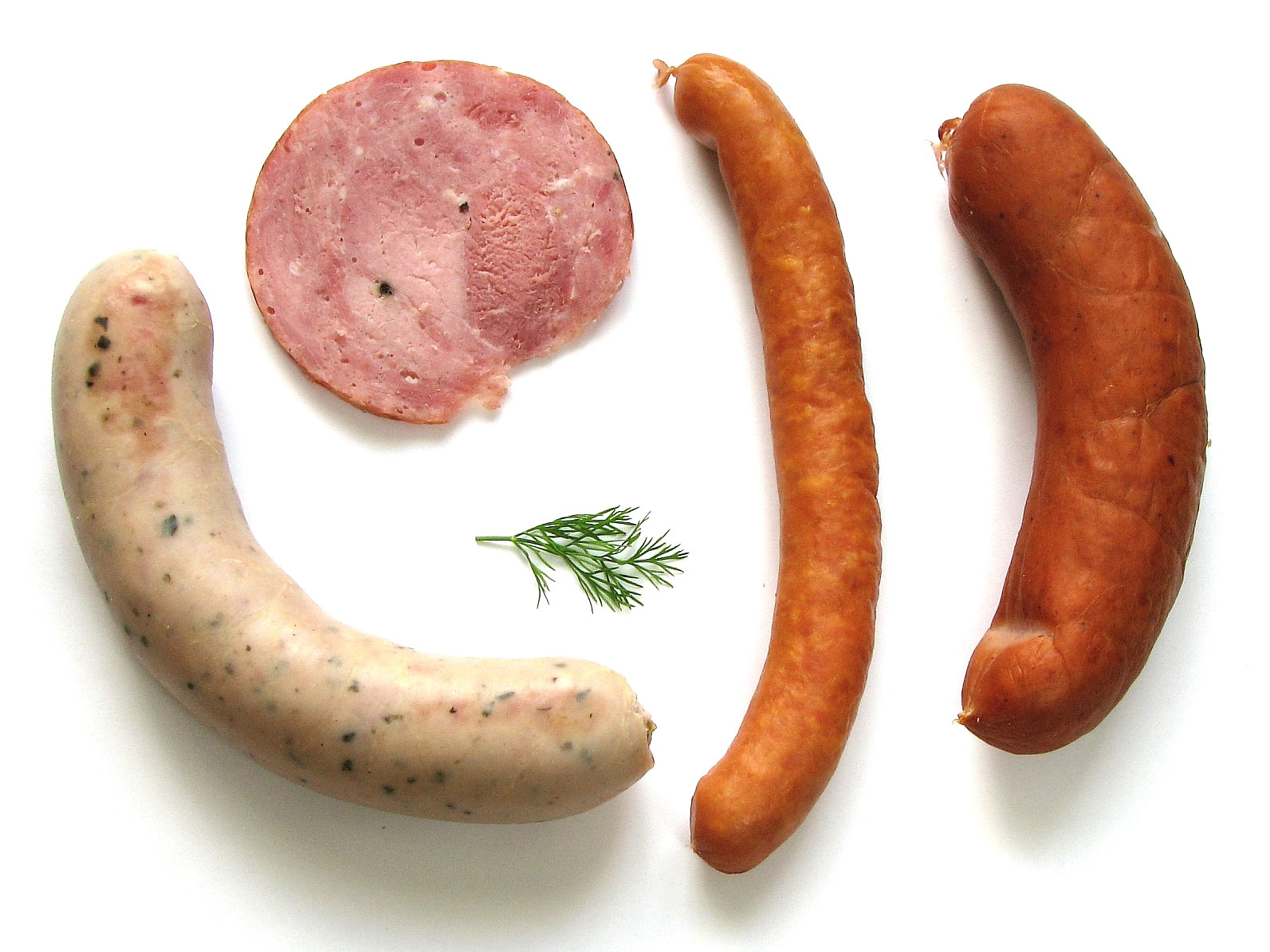
Kiełbasa

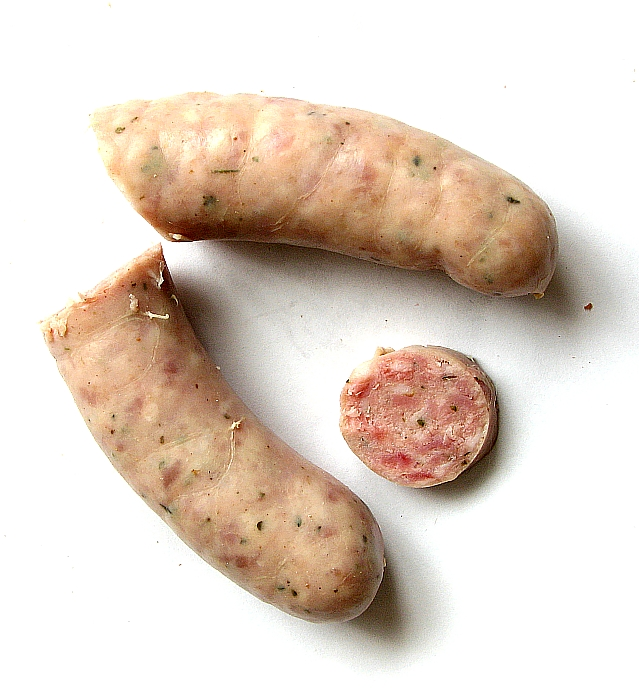
Kiełbasa biała

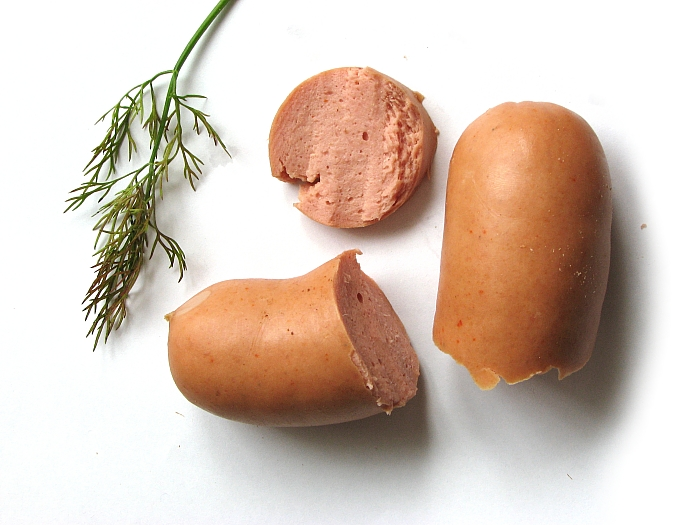
Kiełbasa parówkowa

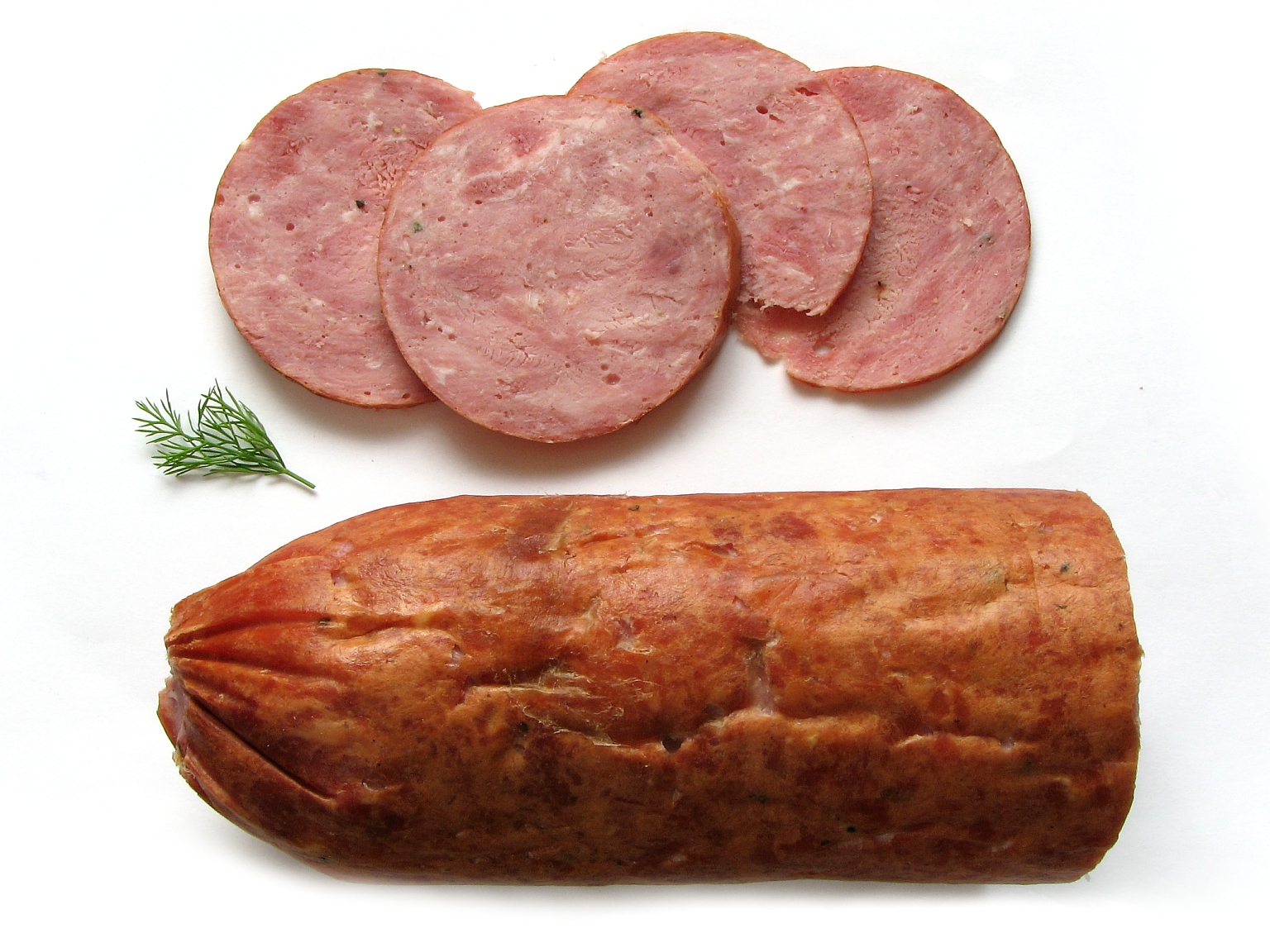
Kiełbasa Szynkowa is a ham sausage

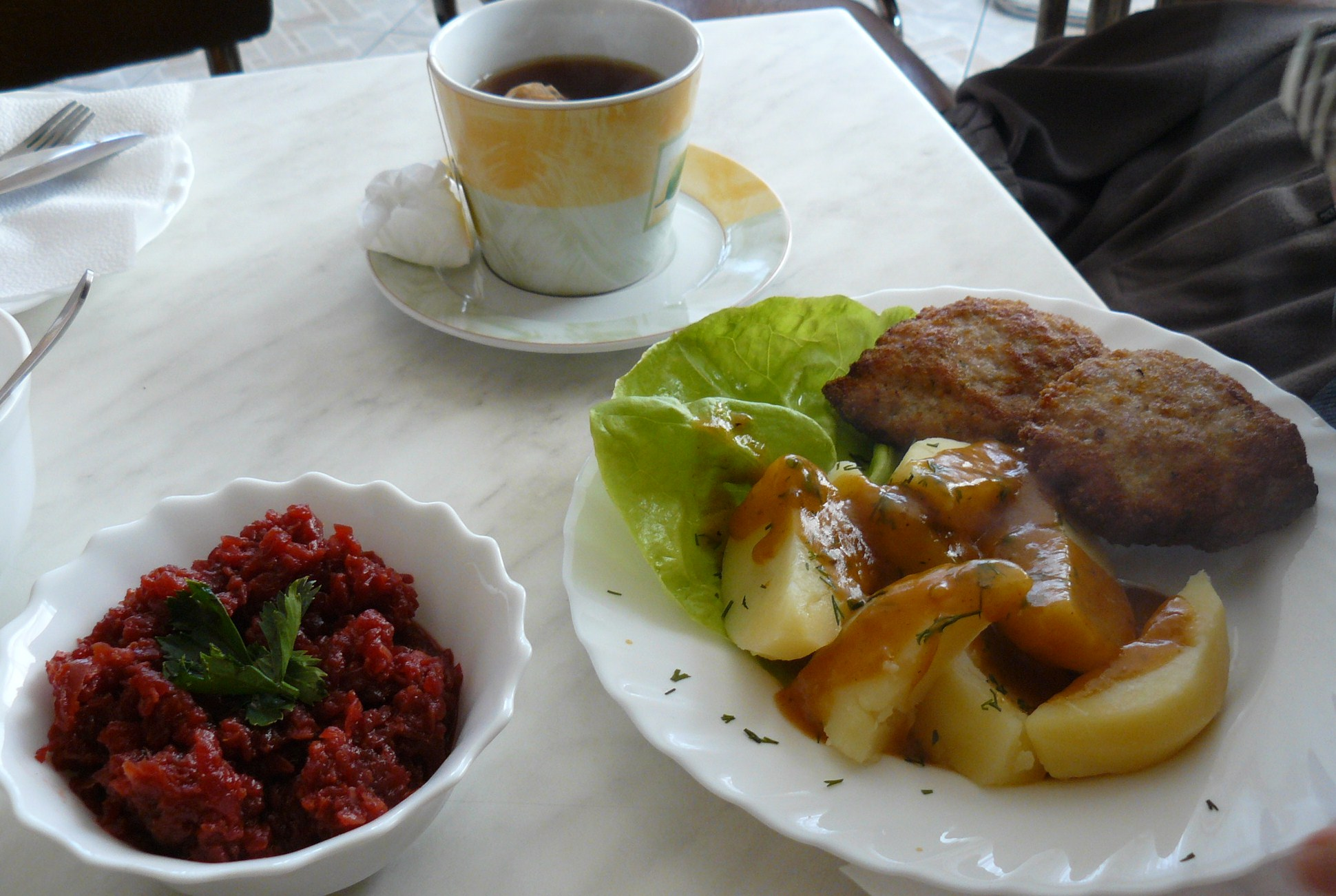
Kotlety mielone – minced pork, potatoes, beets, and tea

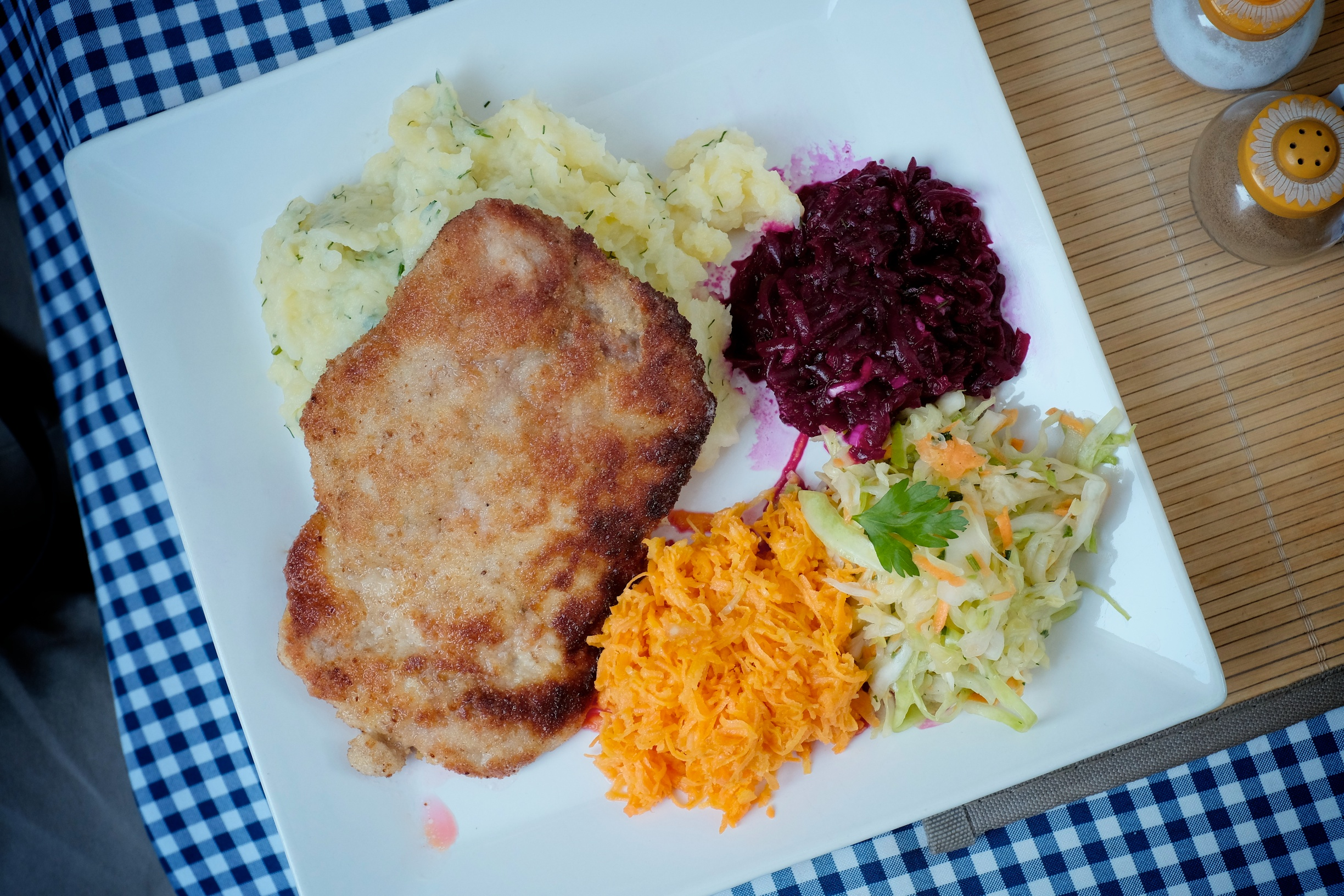
Kotlet schabowy with mashed potatoes

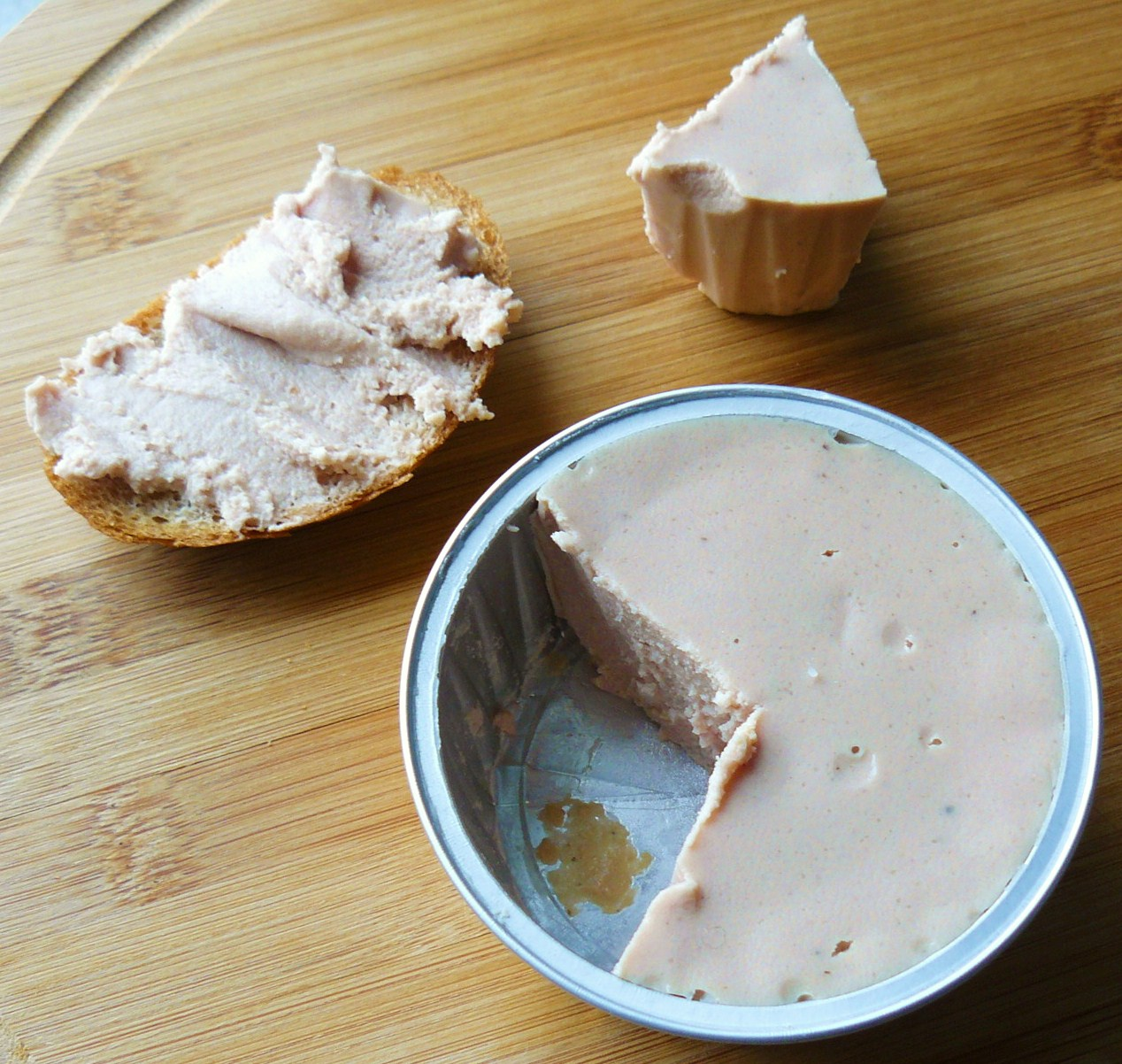
Pasztet – Polish pâté

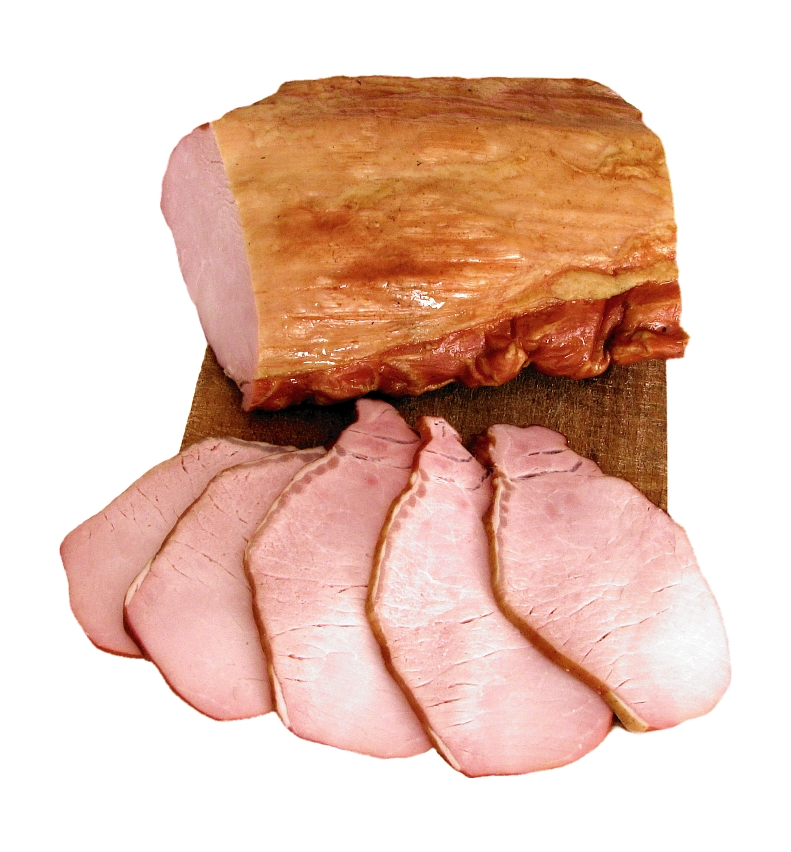
Polędwica – steamed, boned and smoked high quality pork meat

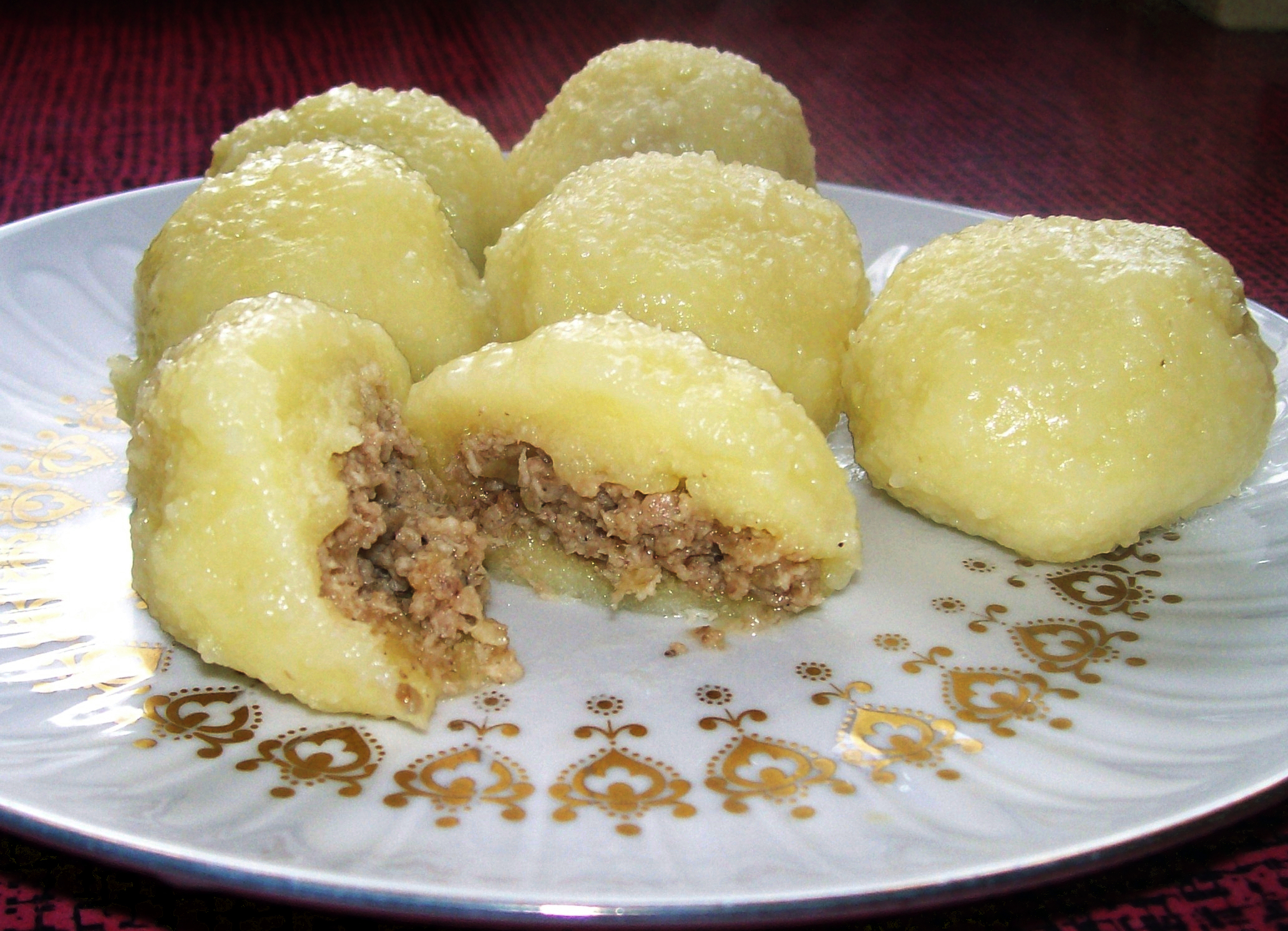
Pyzy z mięsem – potato dough dumplings with meat

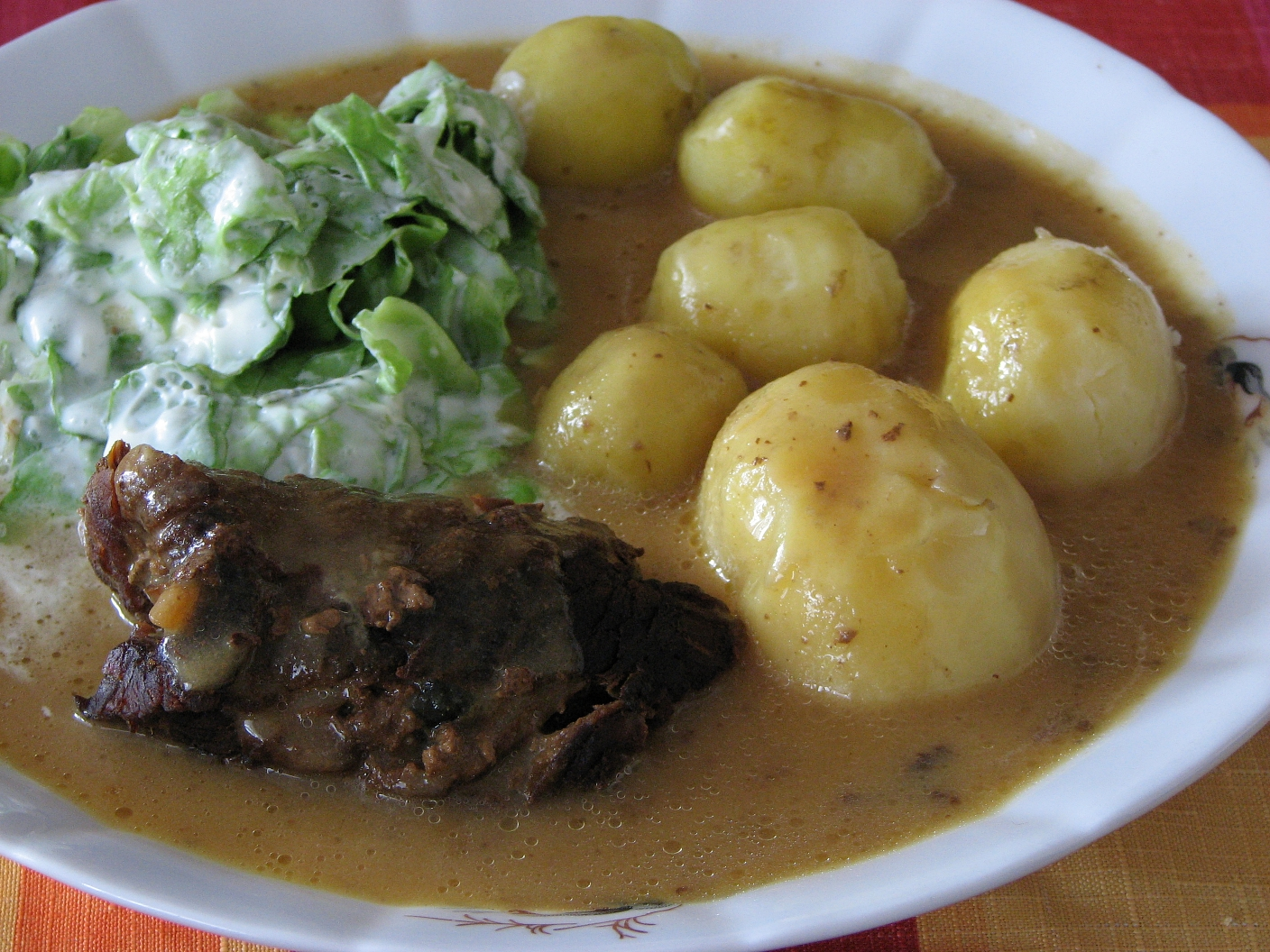
Rolada covered in sauce with potatoes and salad on the side

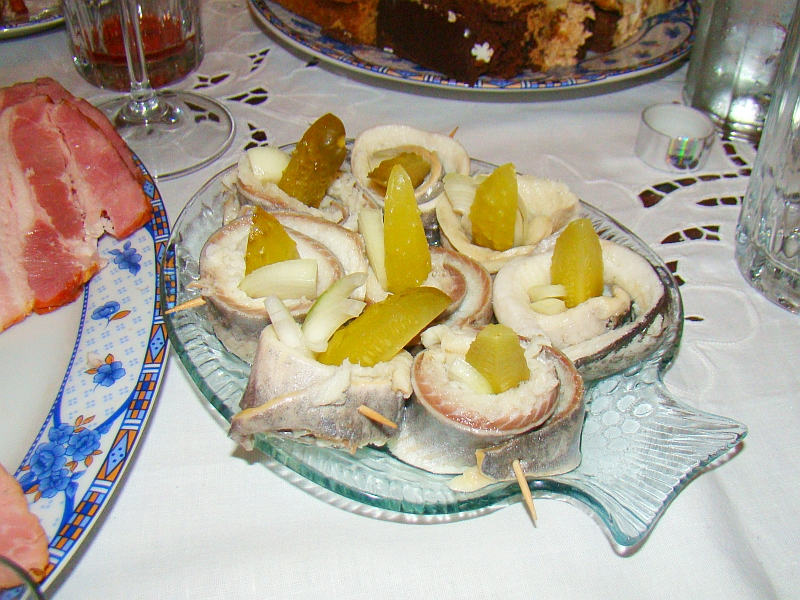
Rollmops, carp, matjas and herring being very important in Wigilia Polish culture. Christmas Eve table in Poland.

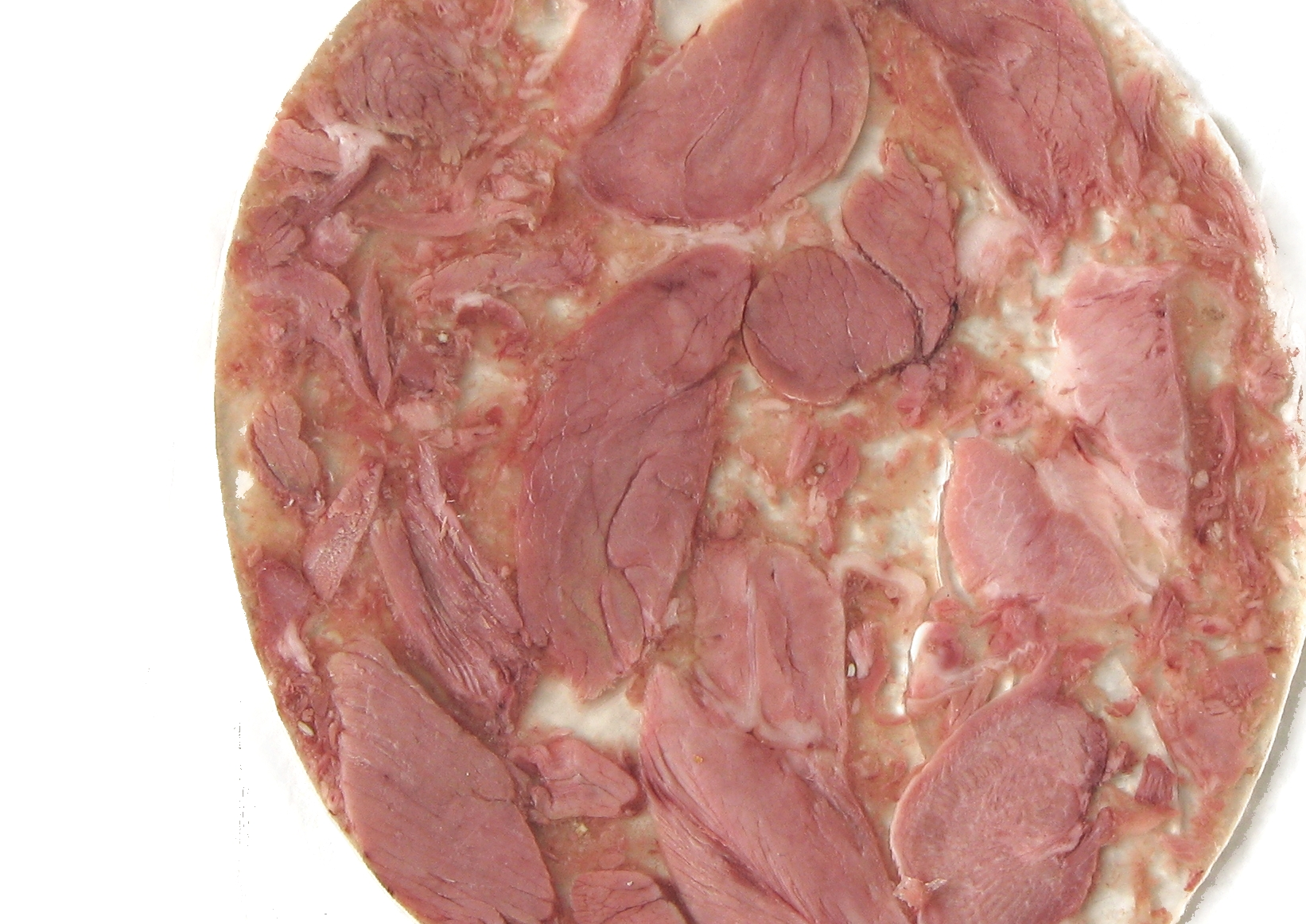
Salceson

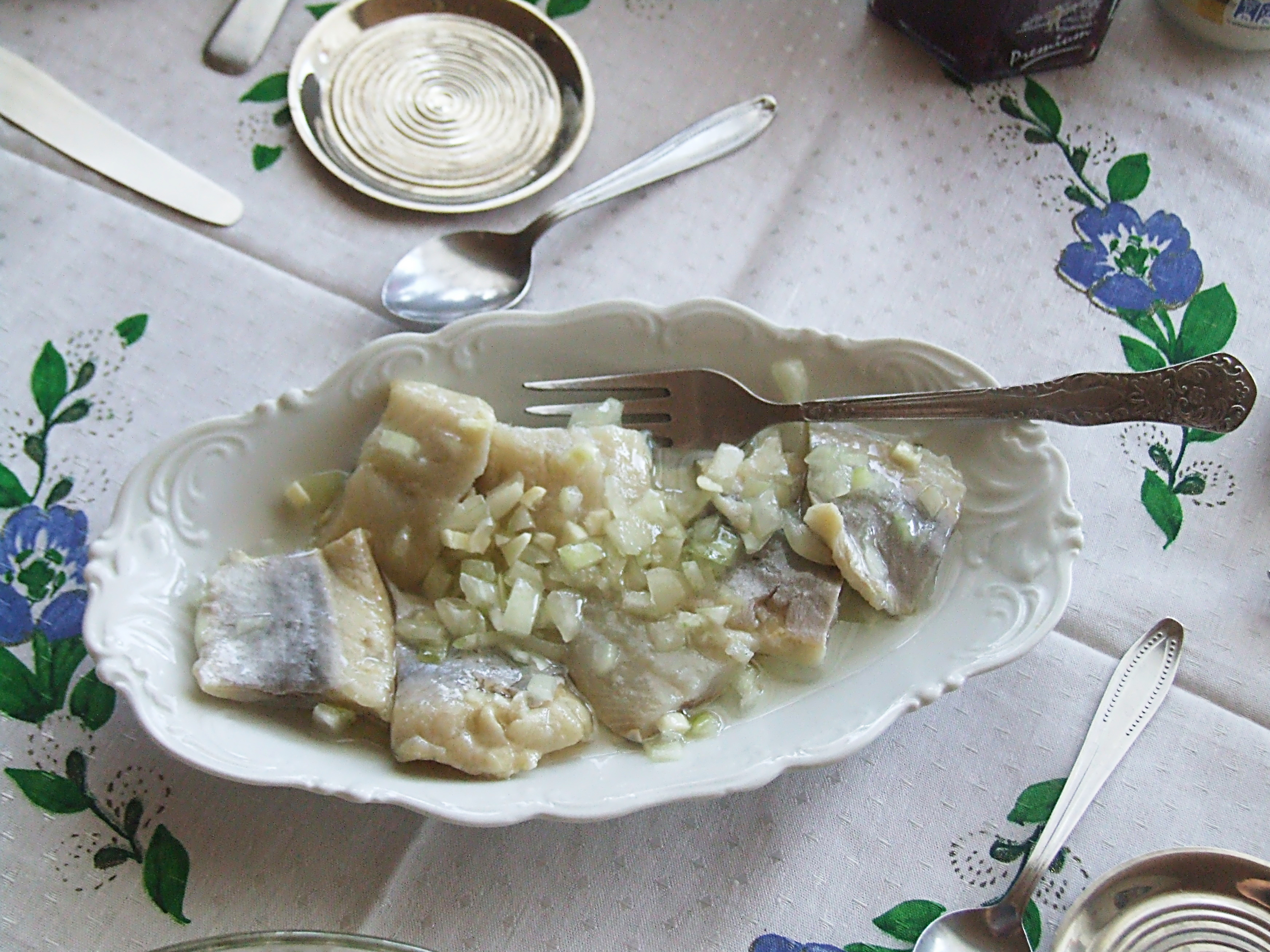
Śledzie – herring in oil with onions

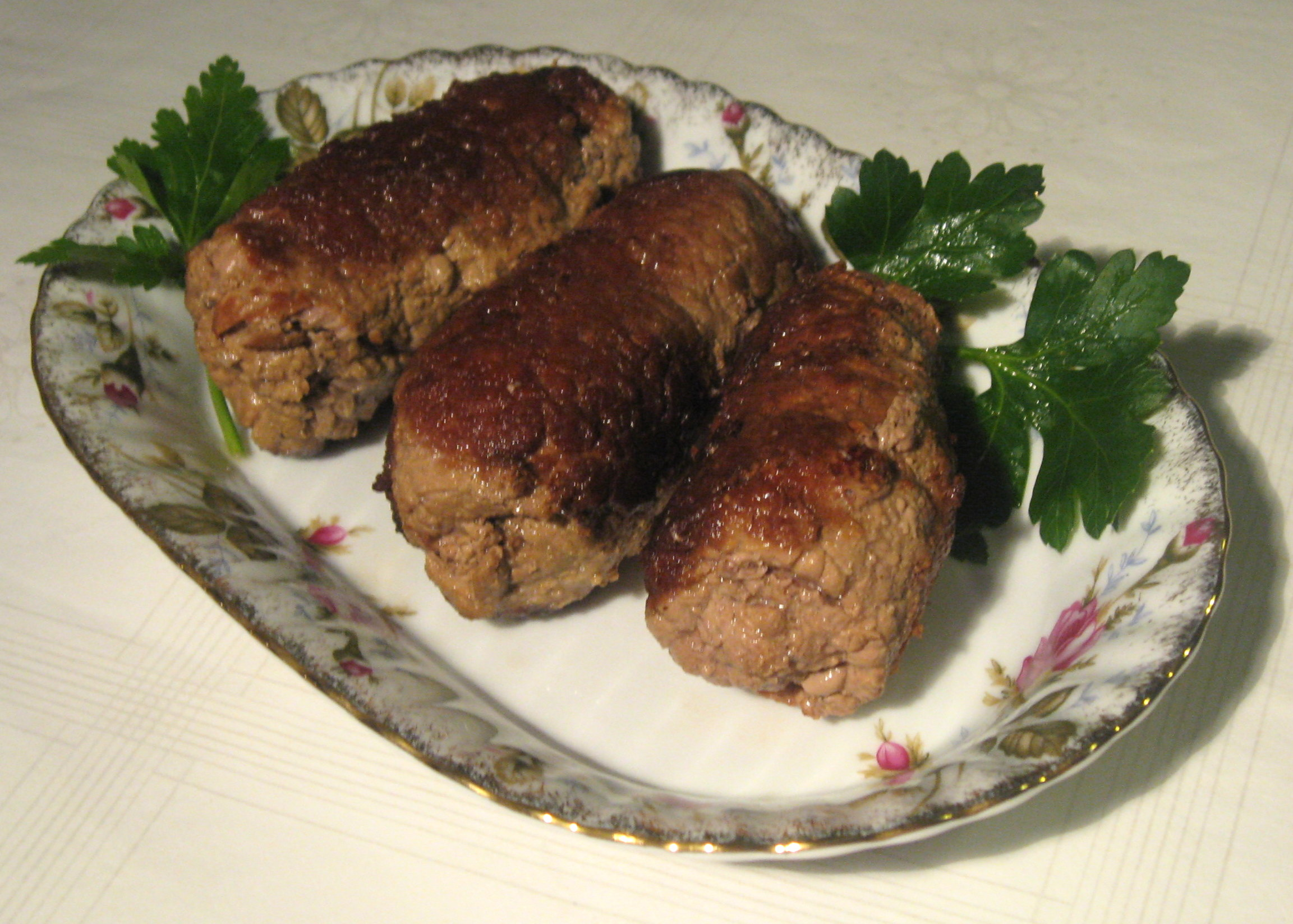
Zrazy

=== Sweet pastries and cakes ===
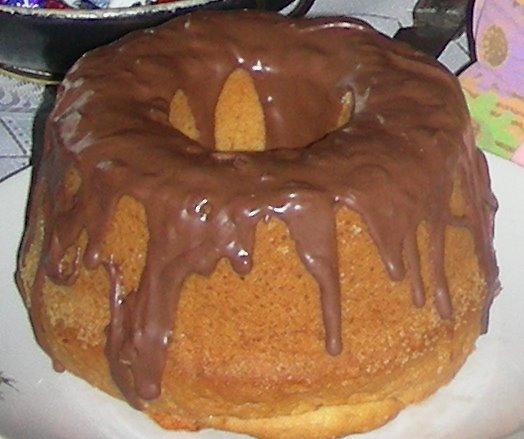
Babka wielkanocna cake

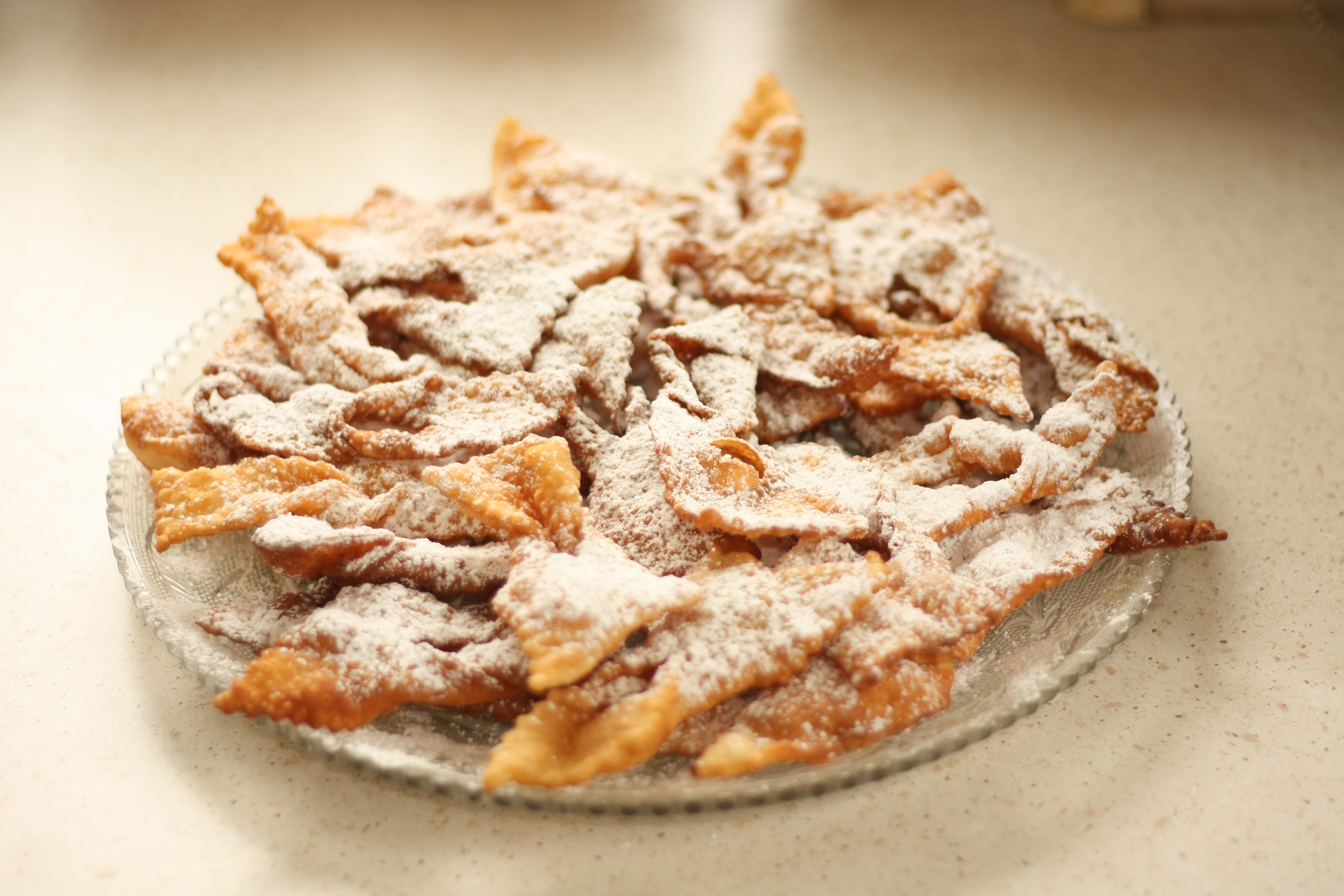
Faworki

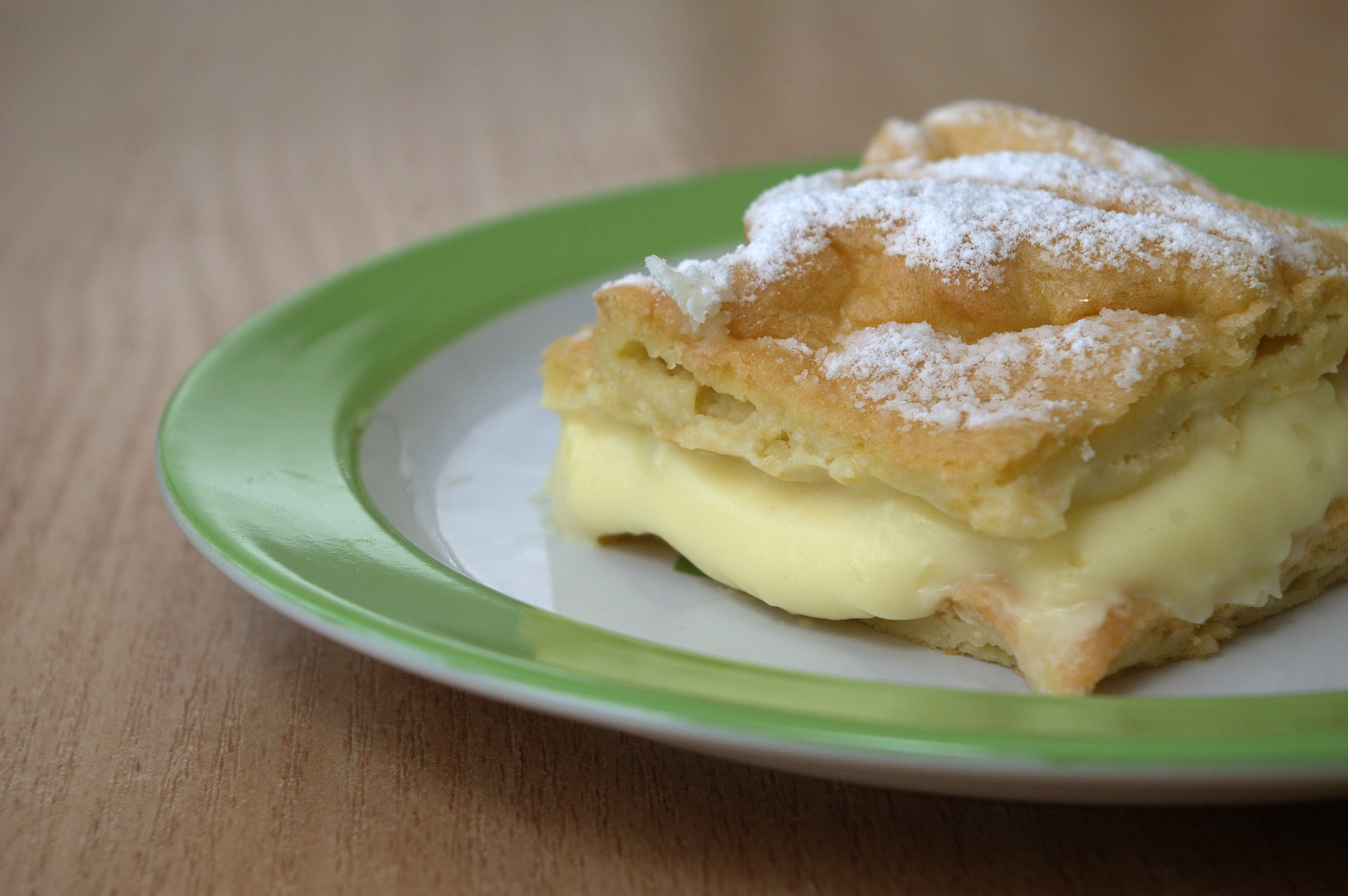
Karpatka cake

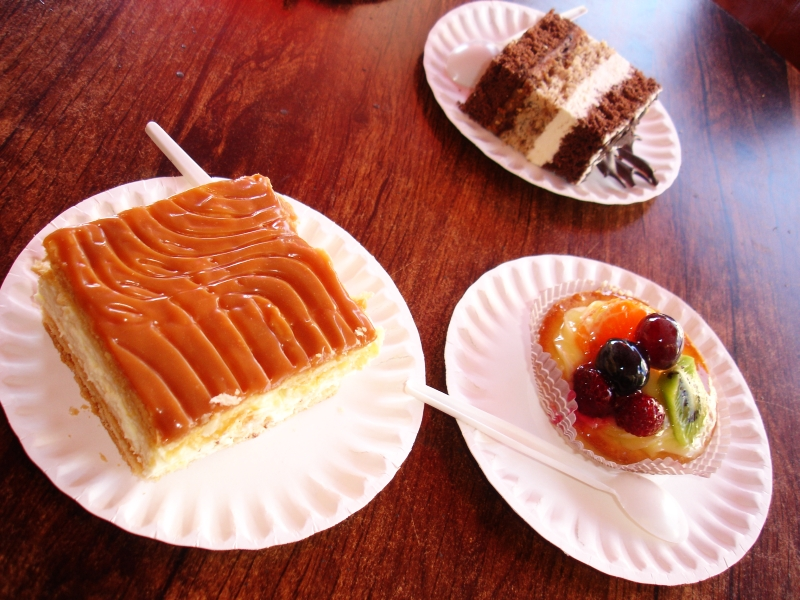
Kremówka, mufinka and czekoladowe cakes

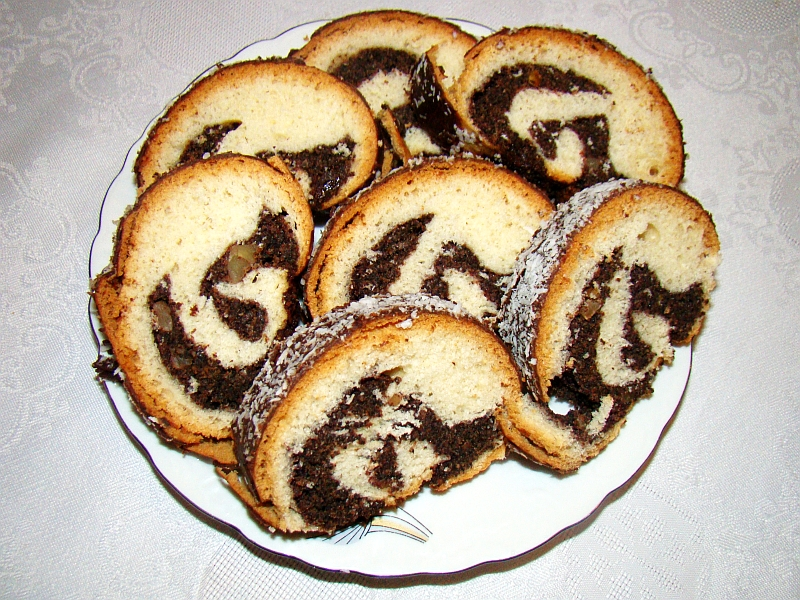
Makowiec – poppy seed cake

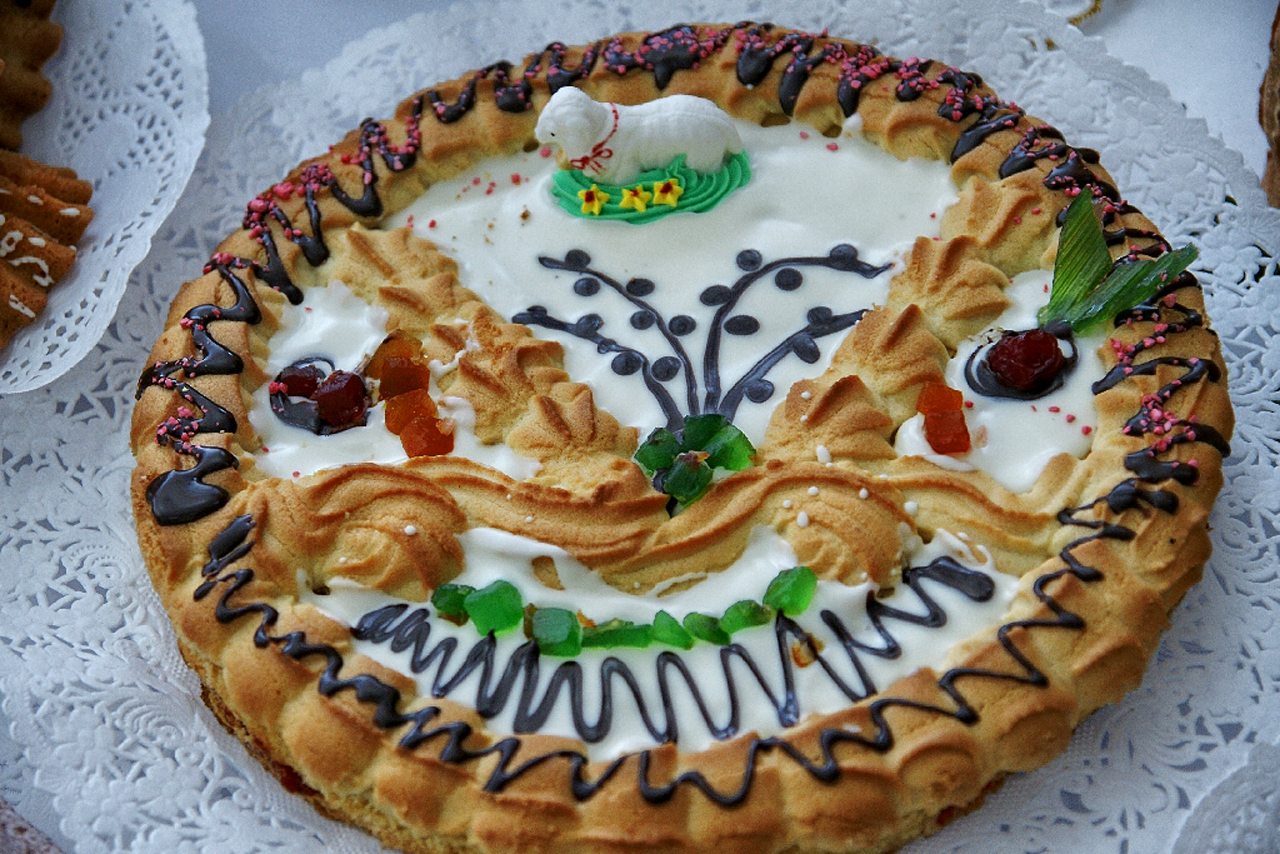
Mazurek, decorated for Easter

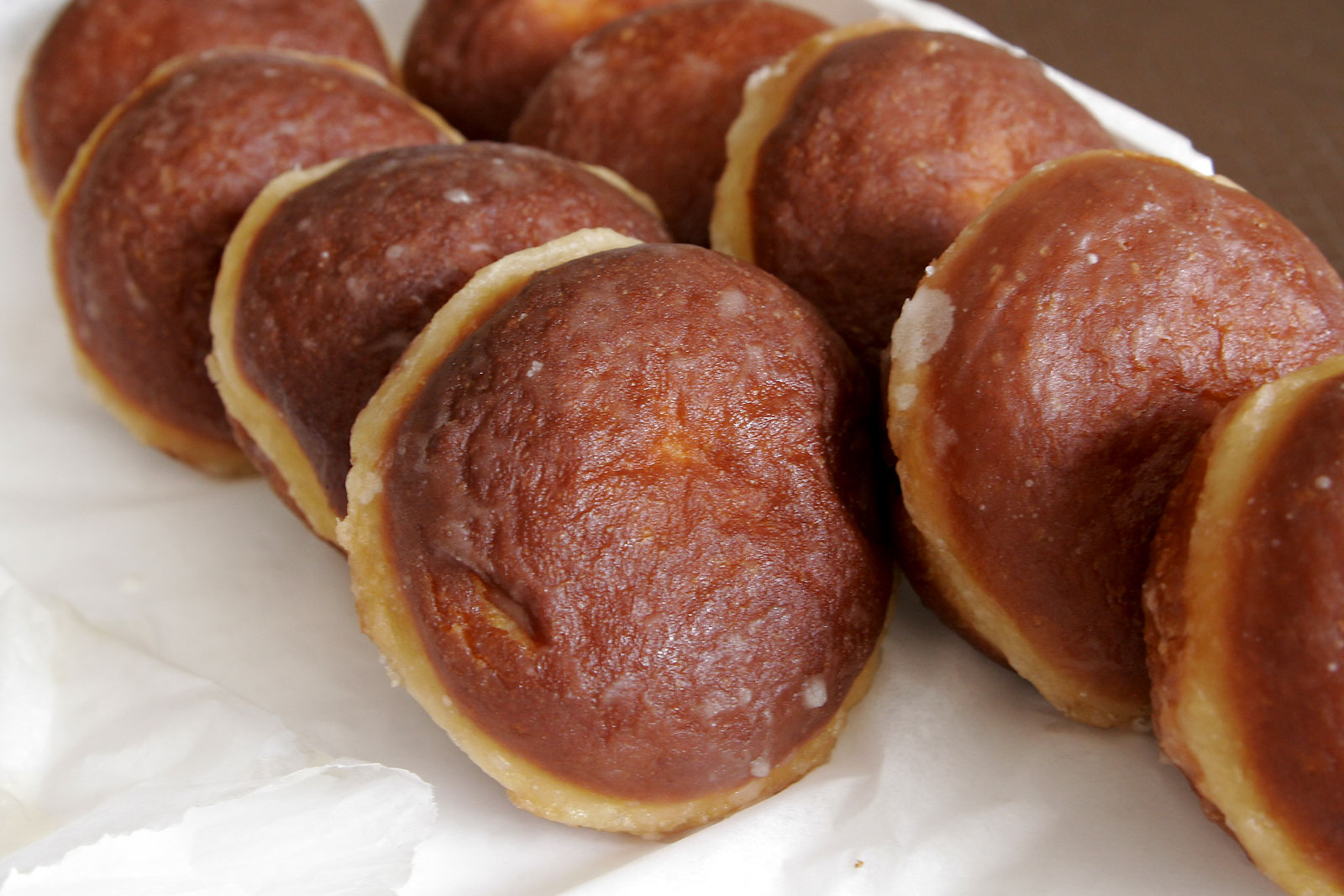
Pączki

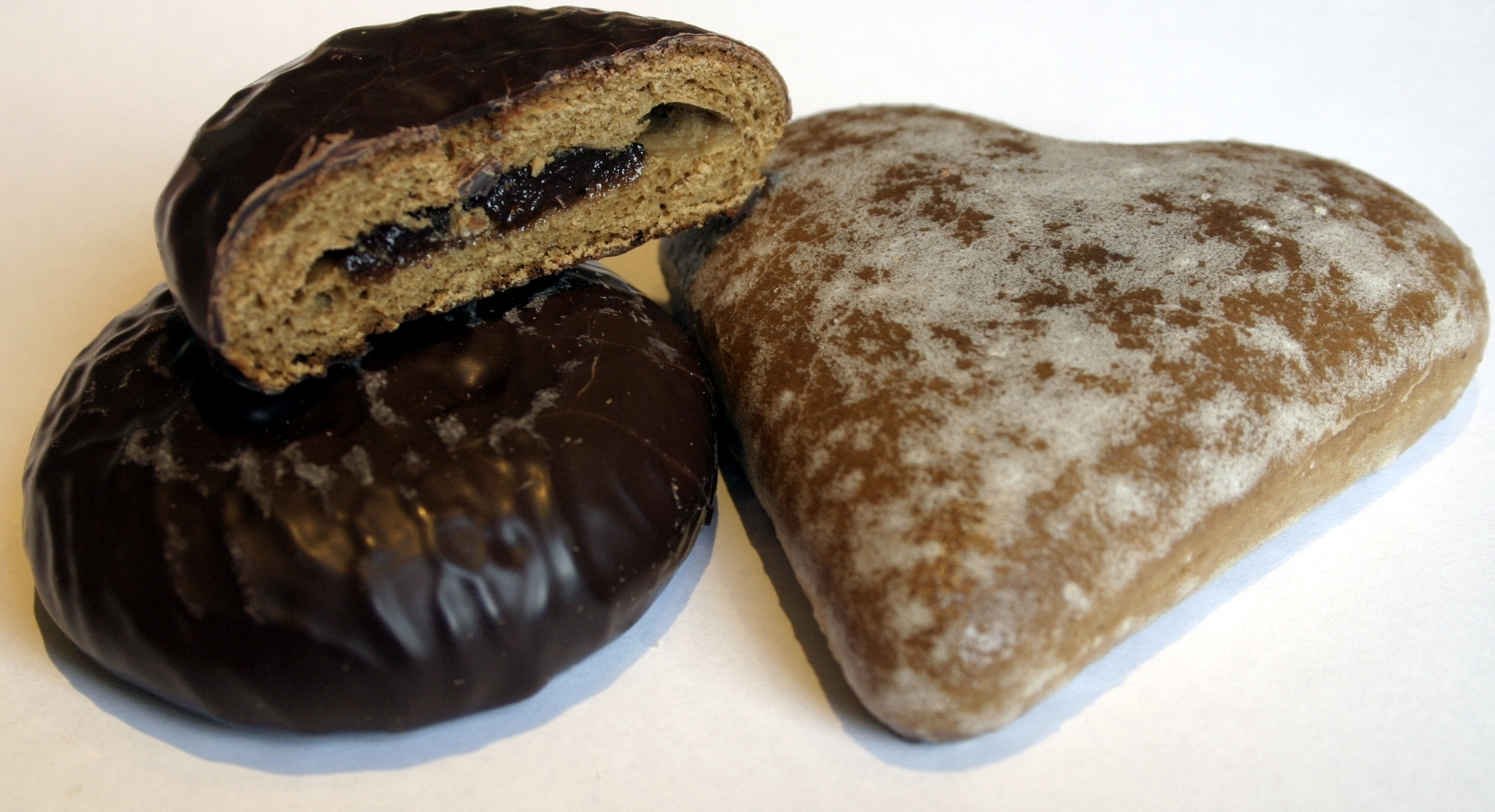
Pierniki Toruńskie – Polish gingerbread cookies, Toruń

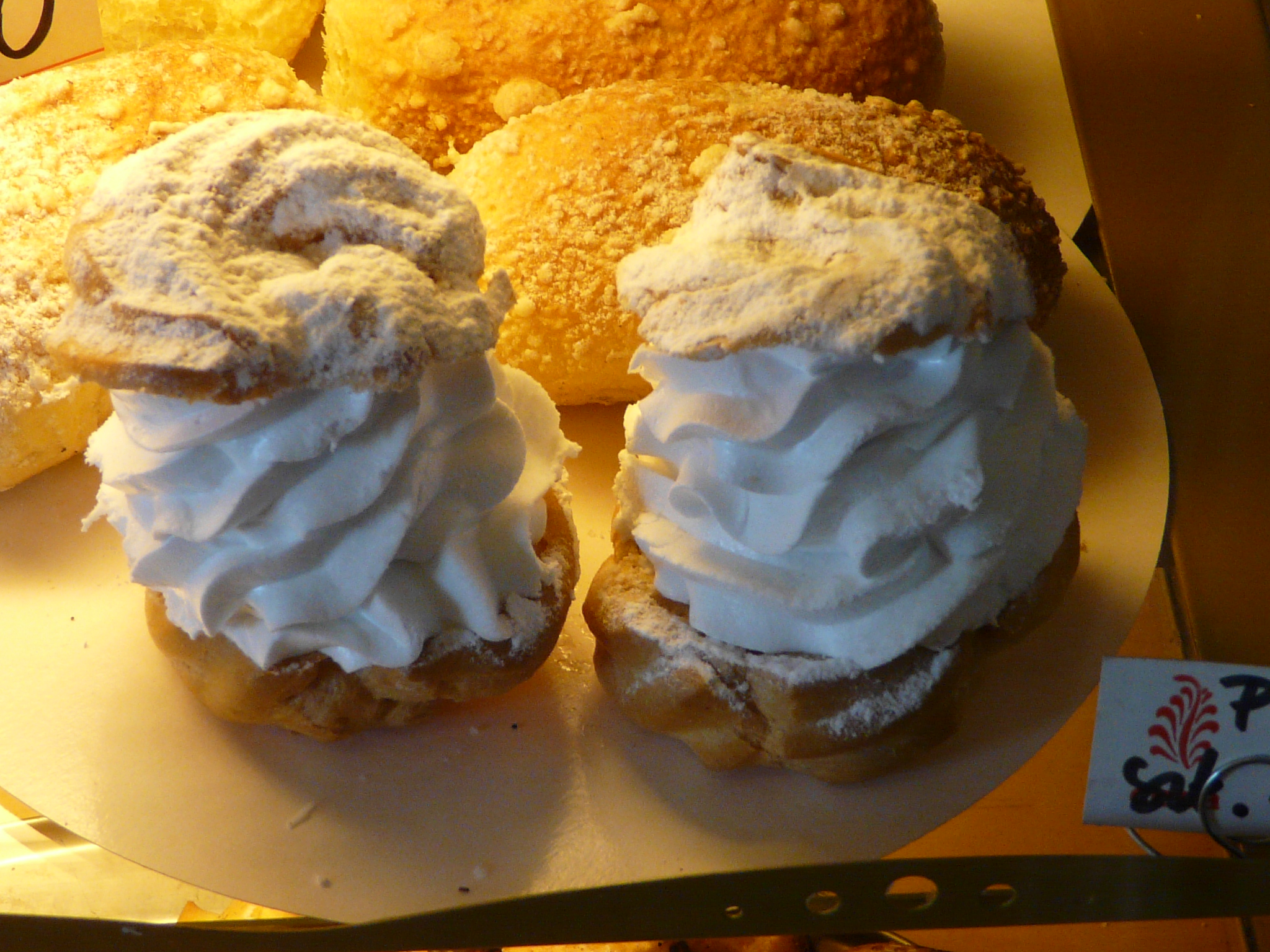
Ptysie cake

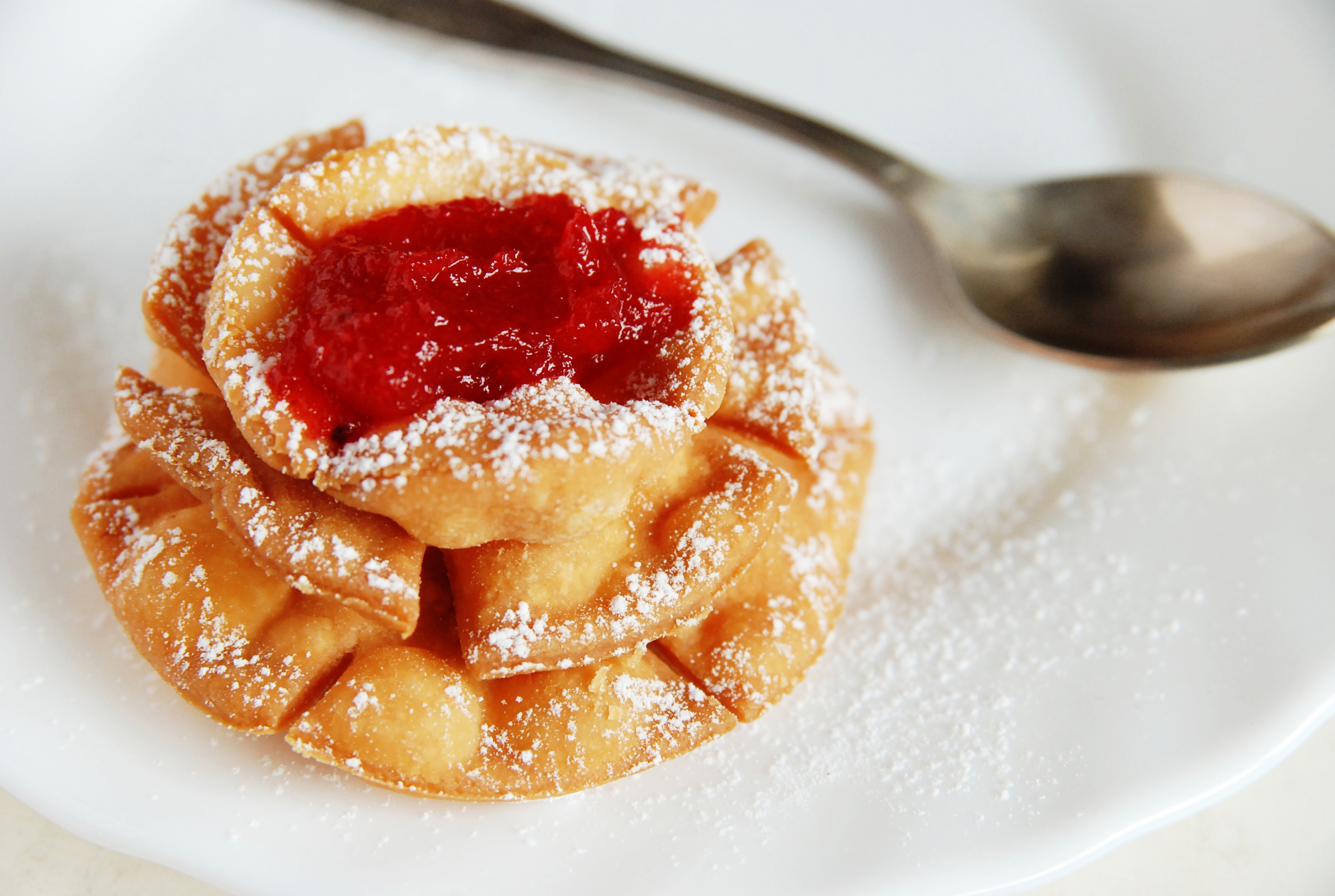
Róża karnawałowa – Carnival Rose cake

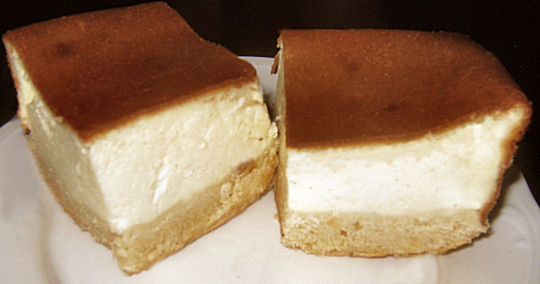
Sernik – cheesecake

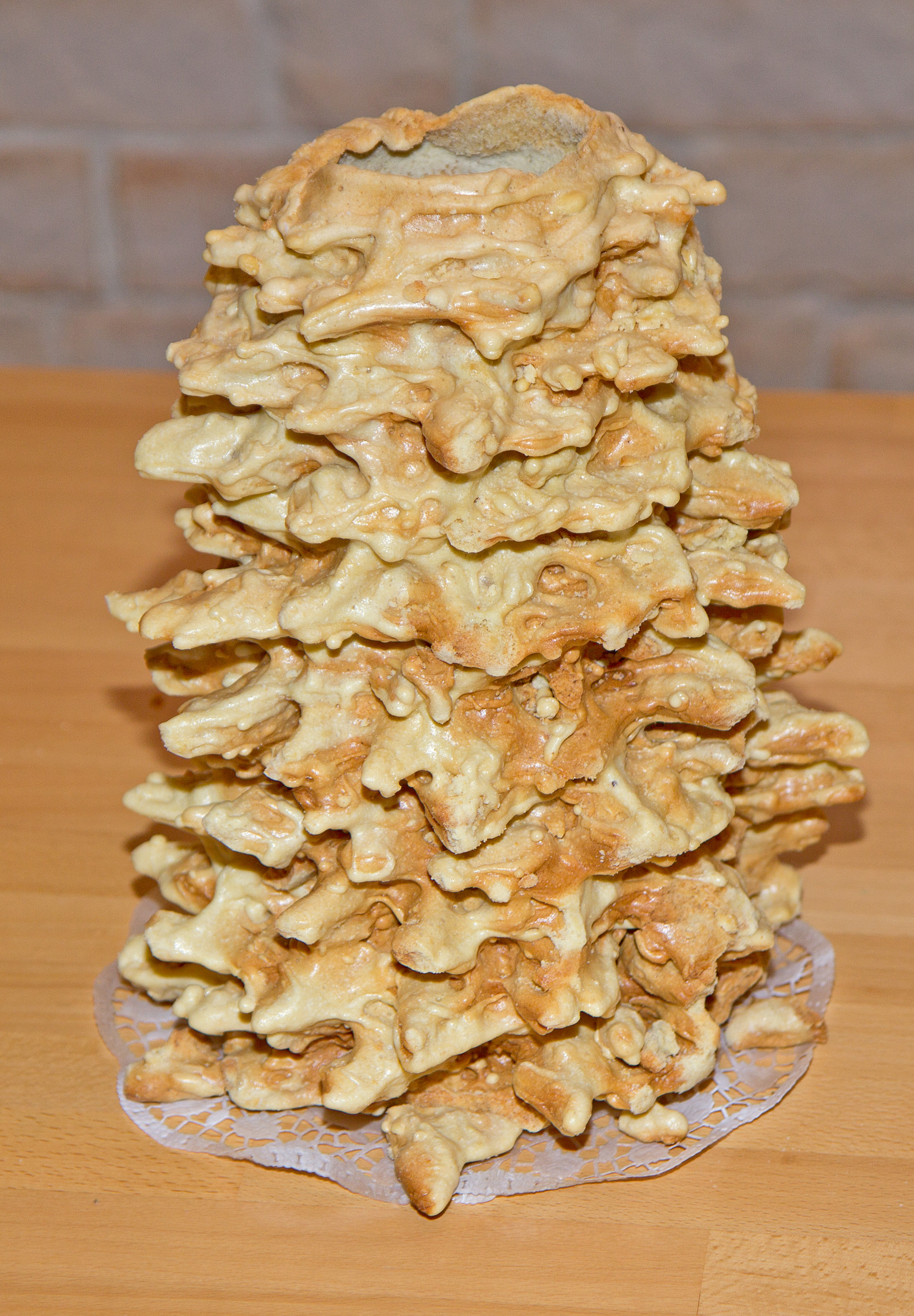
Sękacz – a Polish-Lithuanian traditional spit cake

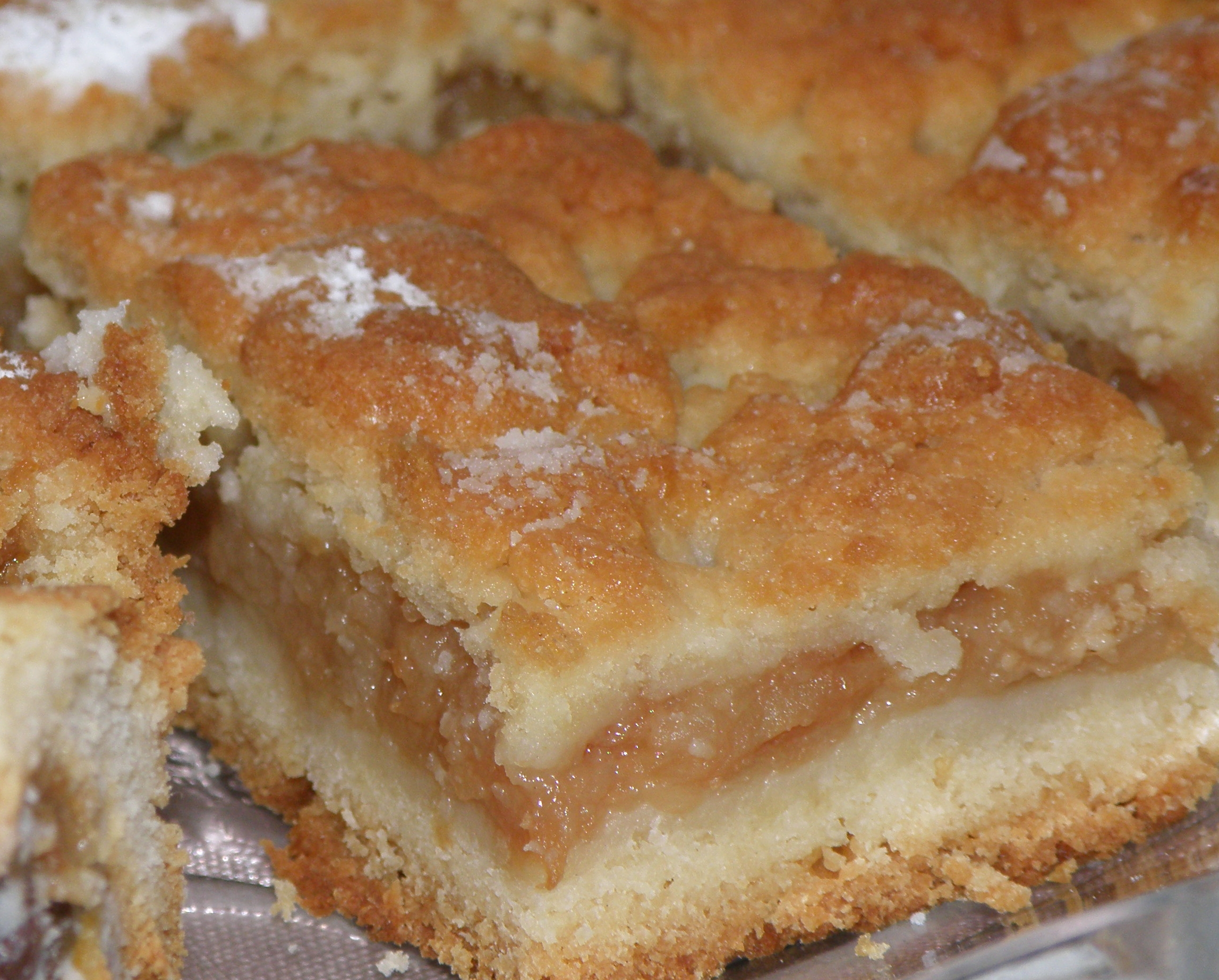
Szarlotka cake

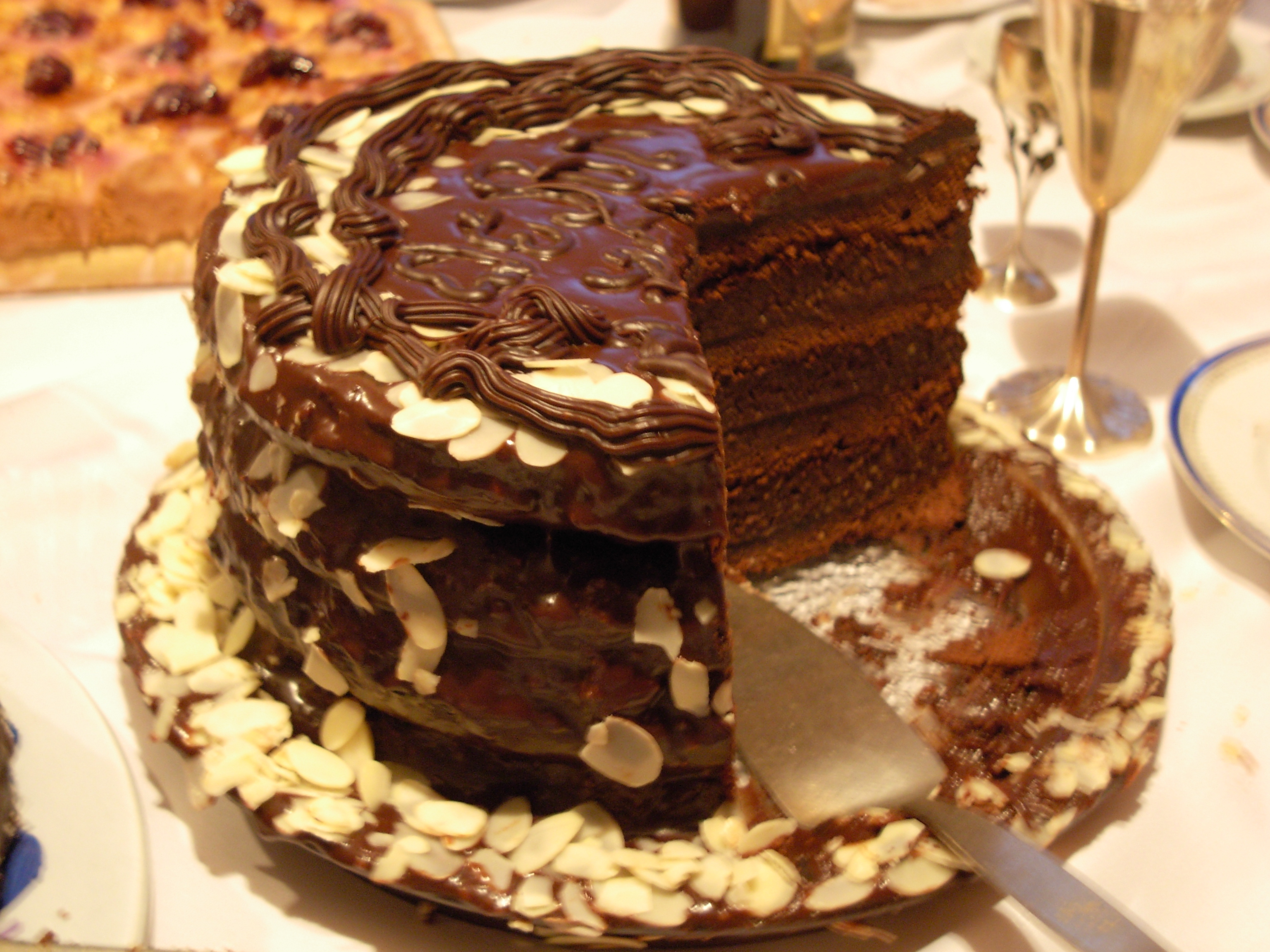
Tort – multi-layered sponge cake filled with buttercream or whippedcream, with fruits or nuts, served on special occasions like nameday or birthday

=== Savoury pastries and bread ===
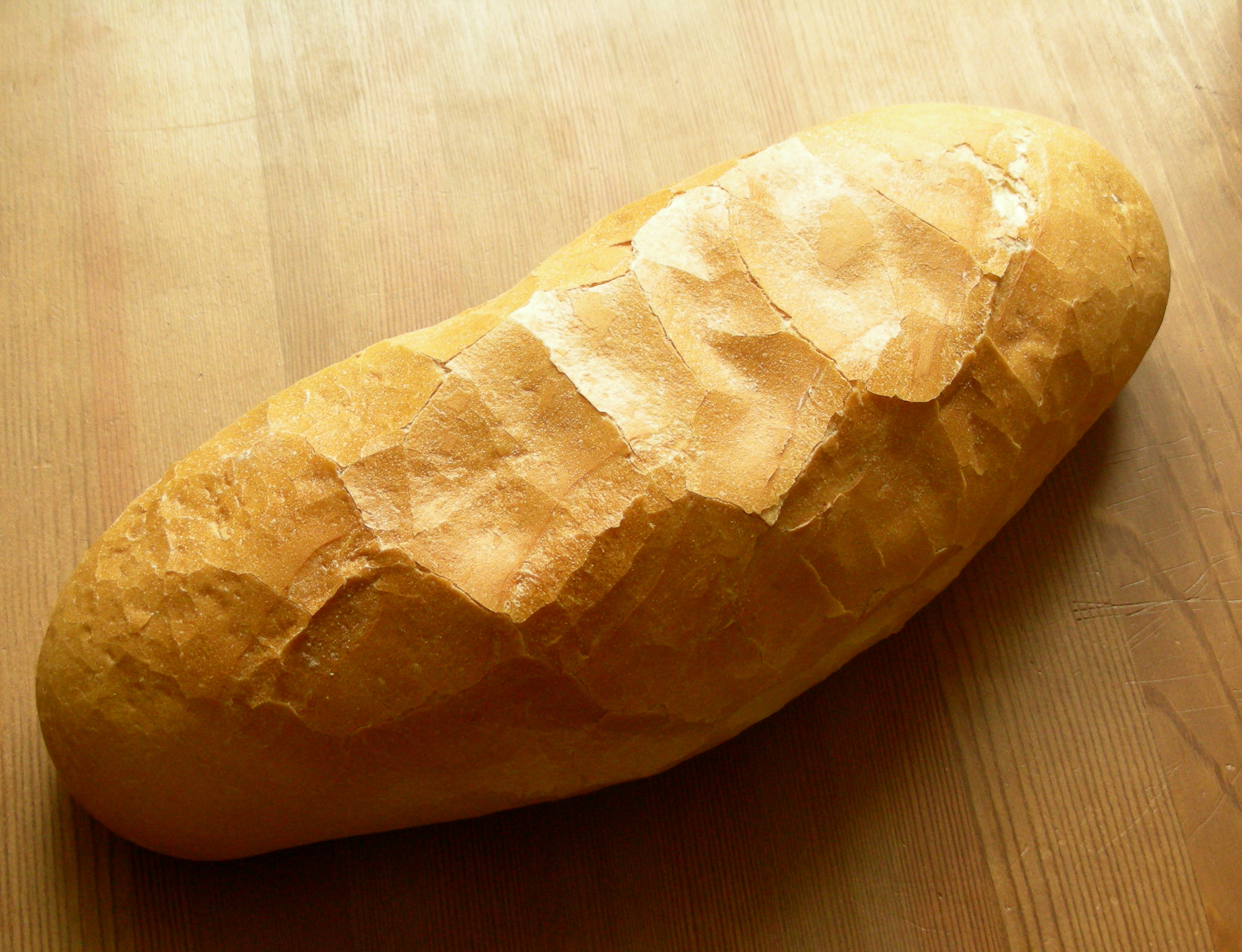
Angielka bread

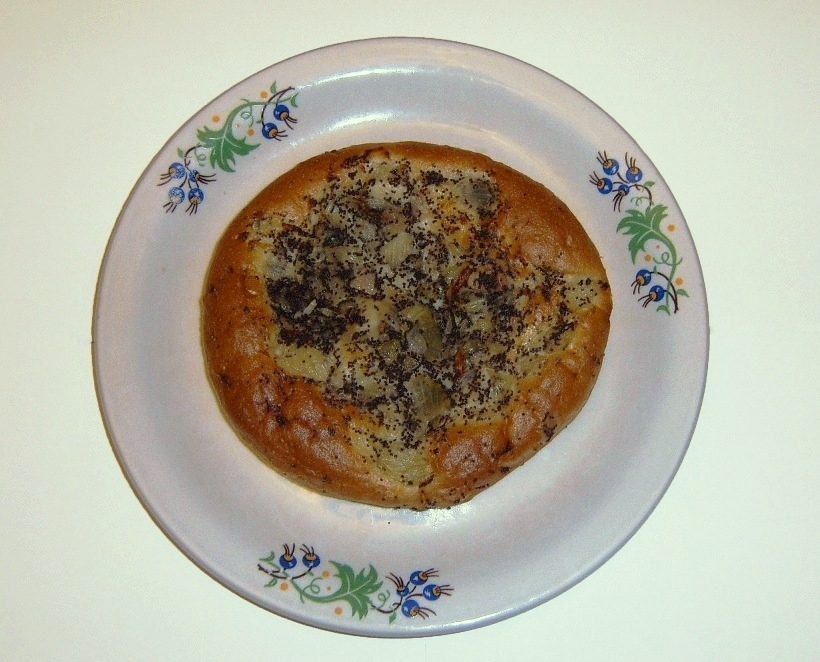
Cebularz – onion cake (wheat)

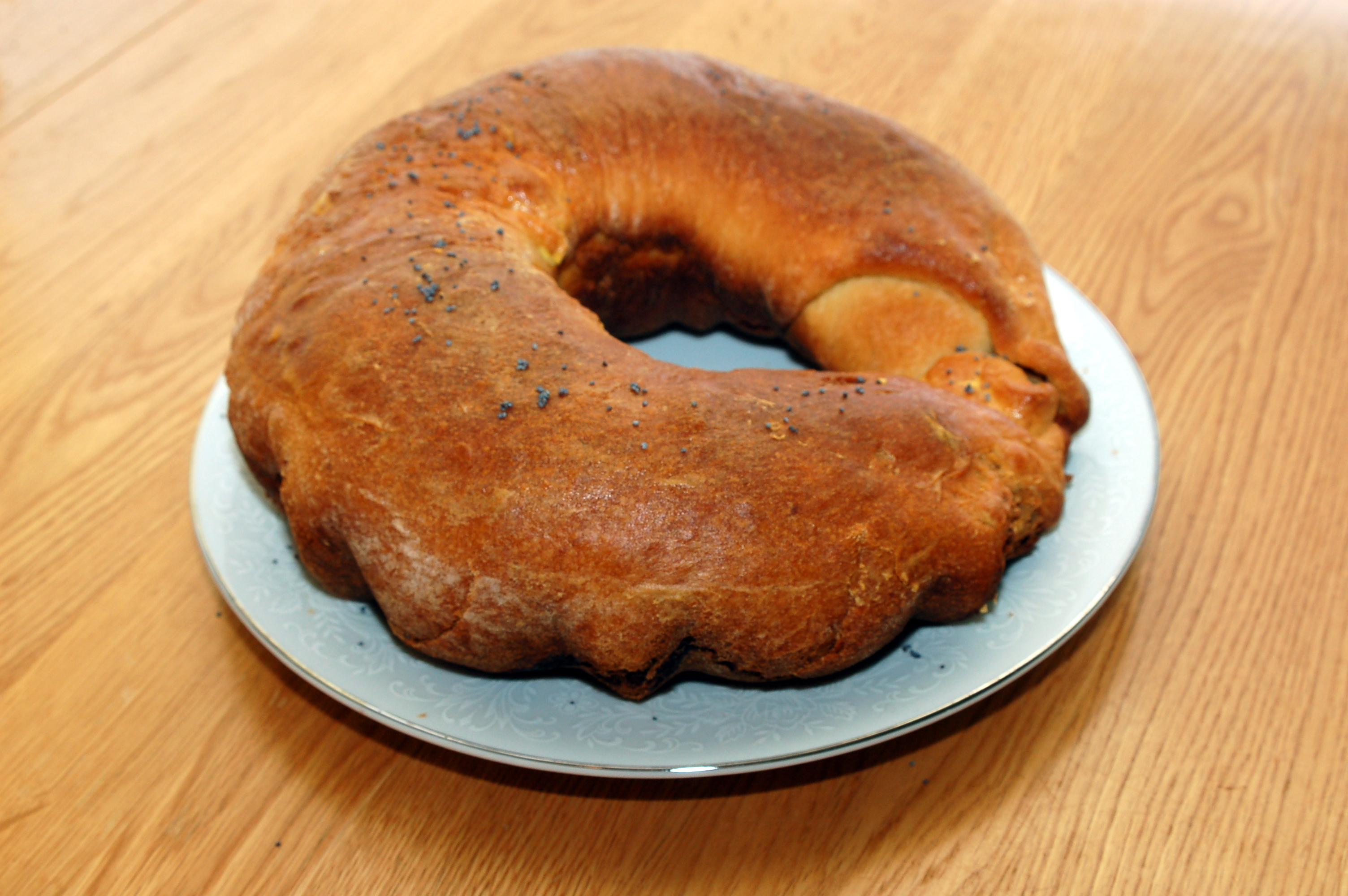
Kołacz – traditional Polish pastry

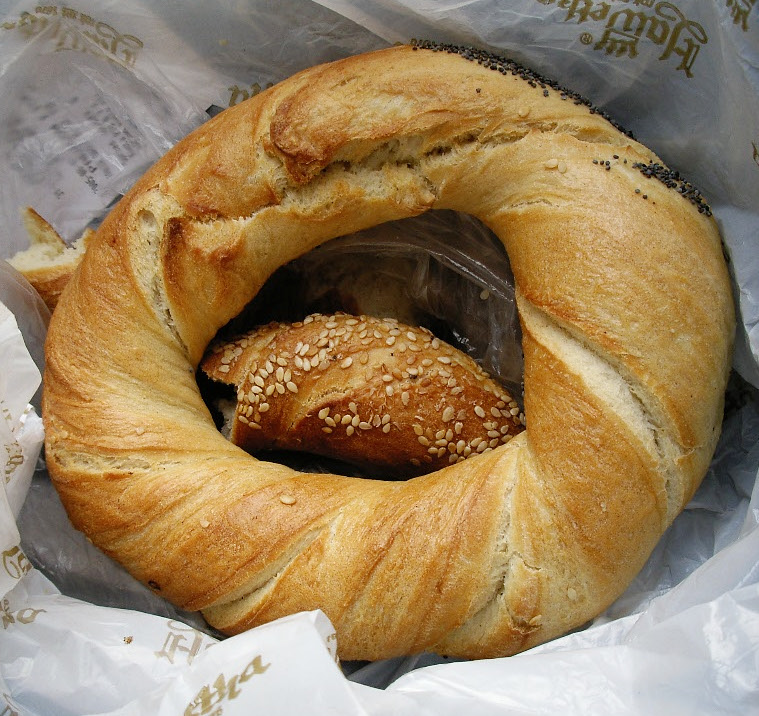
Obwarzanek krakowski – one of the symbols of Kraków, a product of geographical indication in the European Union

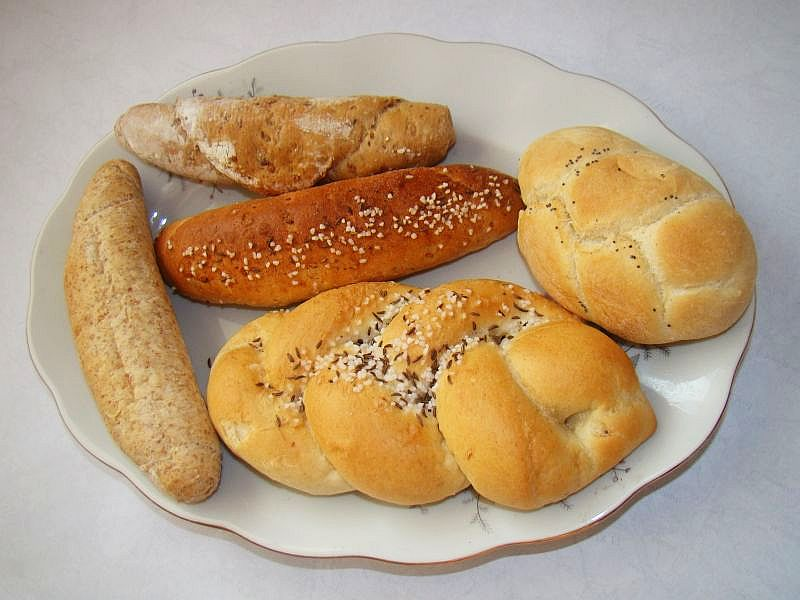
Śląsk breads

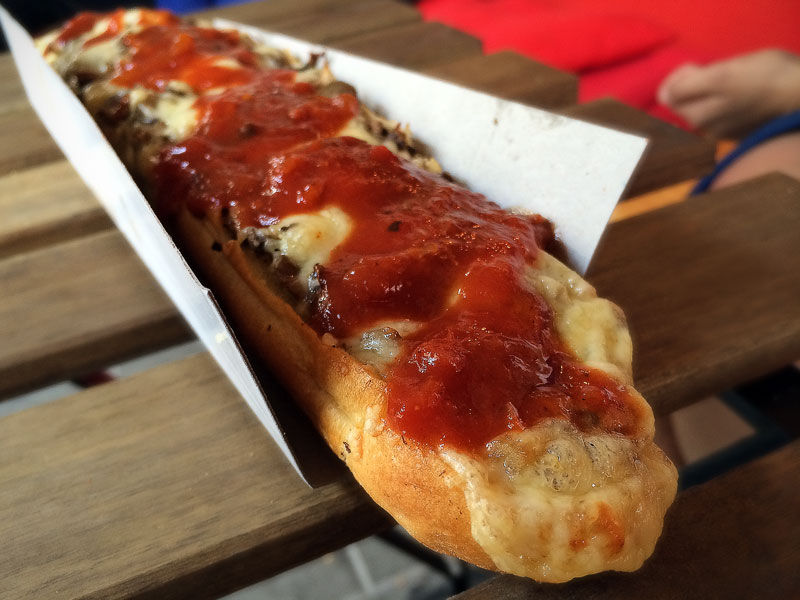
Zapiekanka served on a paper tray

=== Vegetables: salads and pickles ===
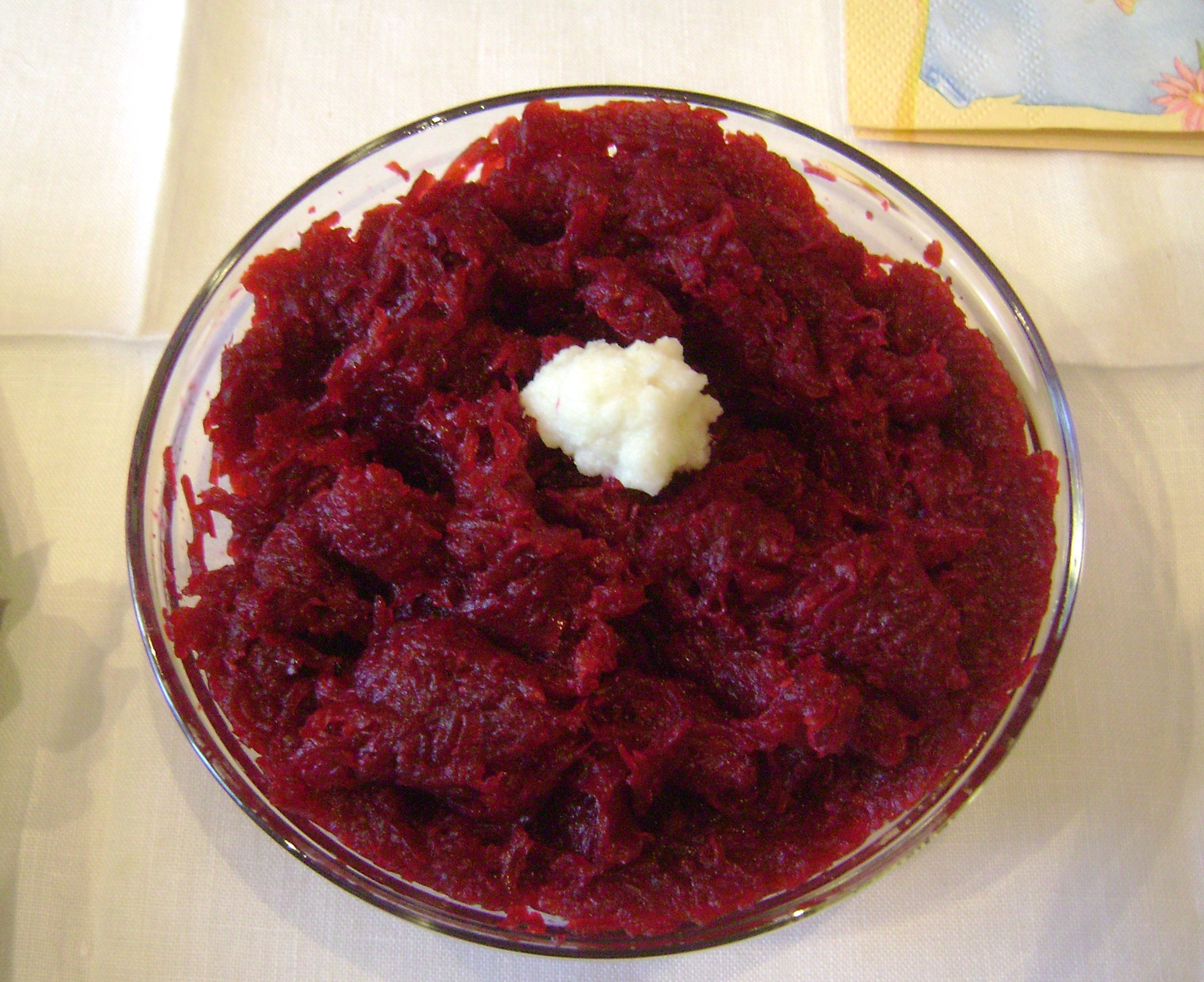
Buraczki – finely chopped warm beetroot salad

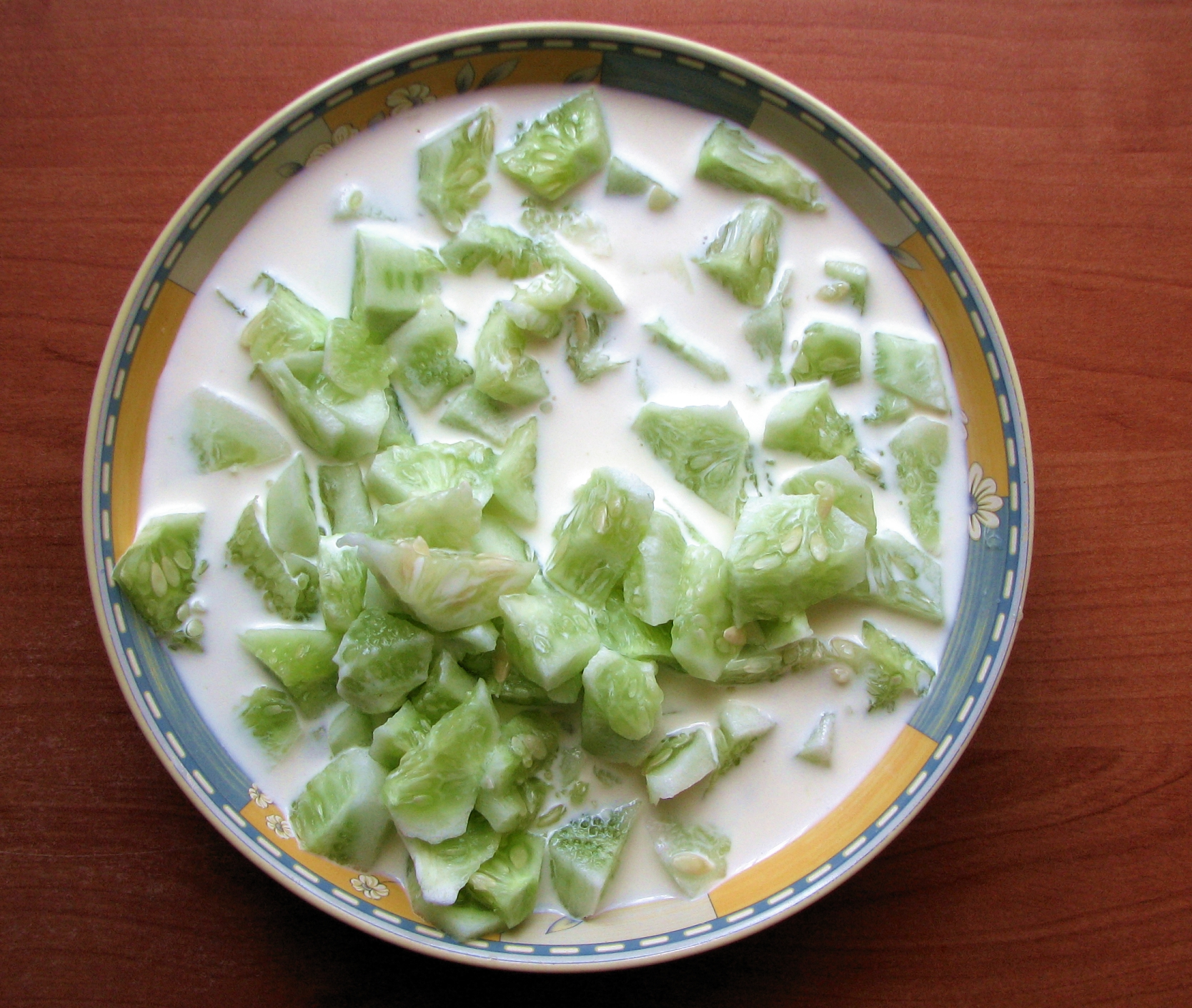
Mizeria (Polish traditional salad made from sliced cucumbers in sour cream with dill)

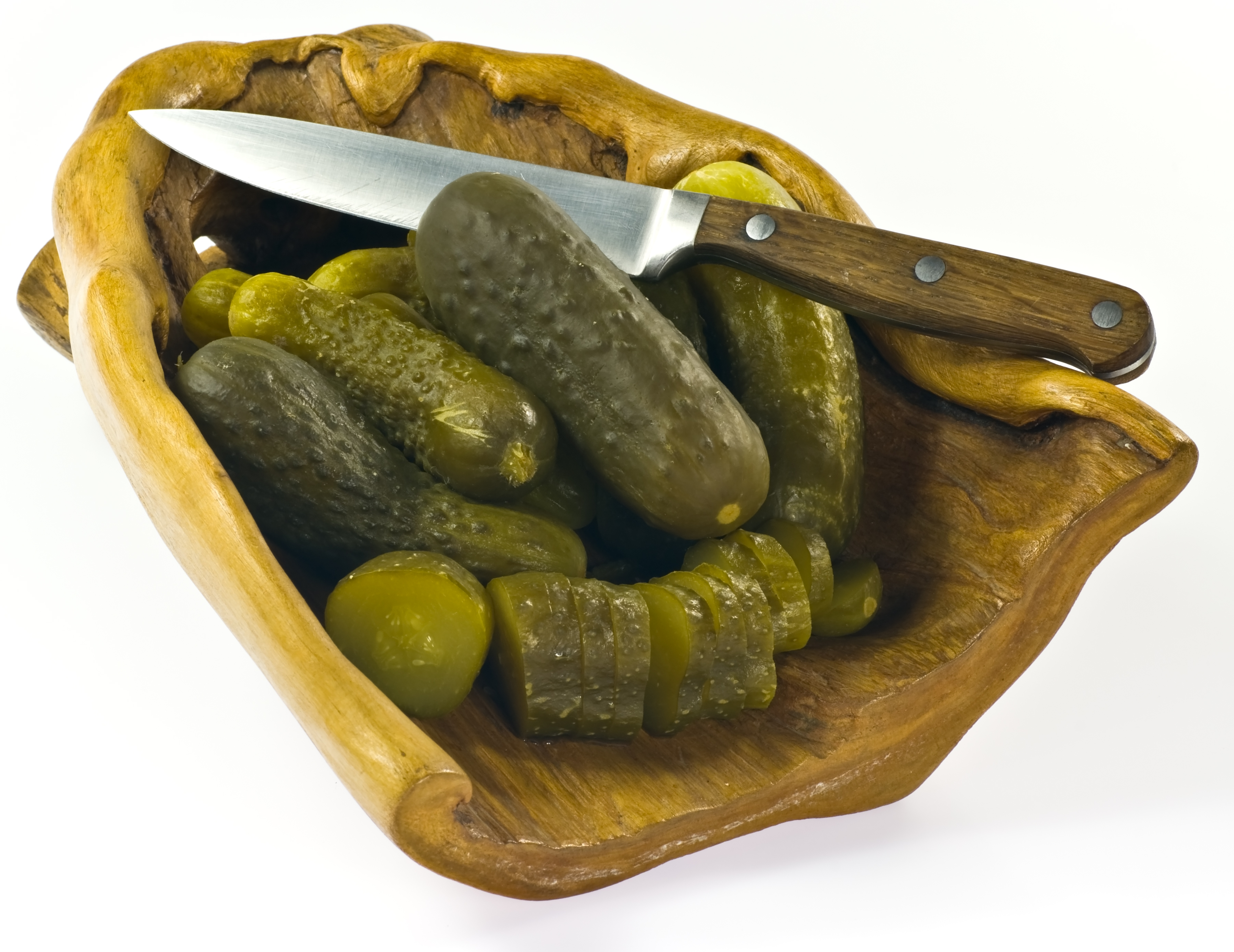
Ogórki kiszone cucumbers in brine

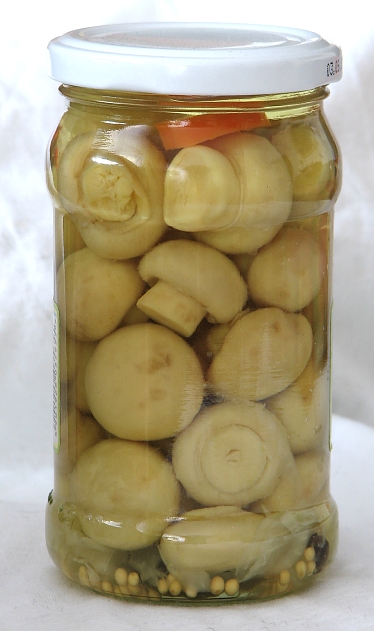
Pieczarki marynowane (marinated mushrooms)

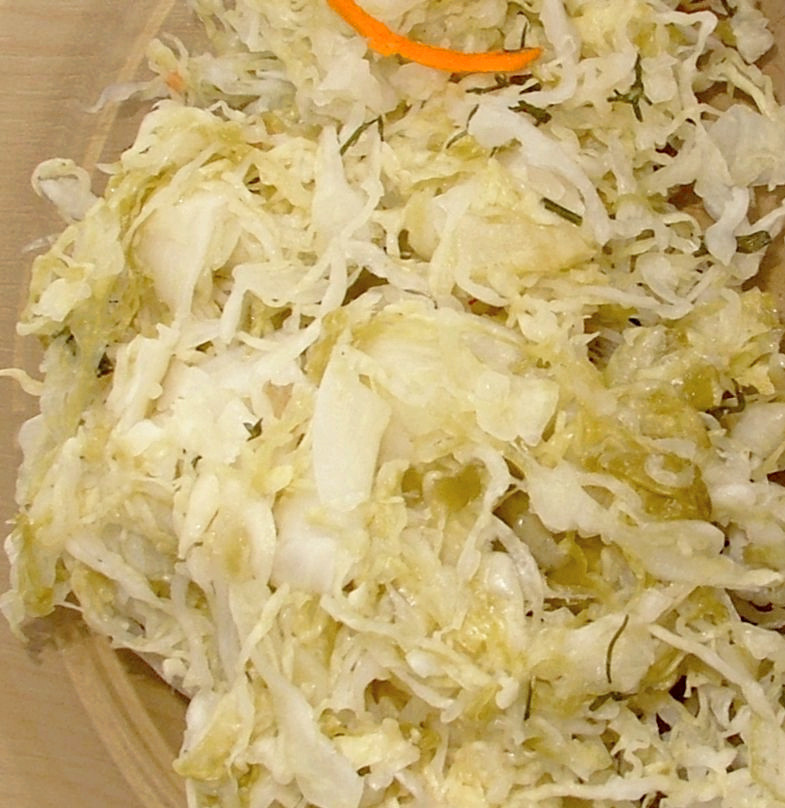
Kapusta kiszona (sauerkraut)

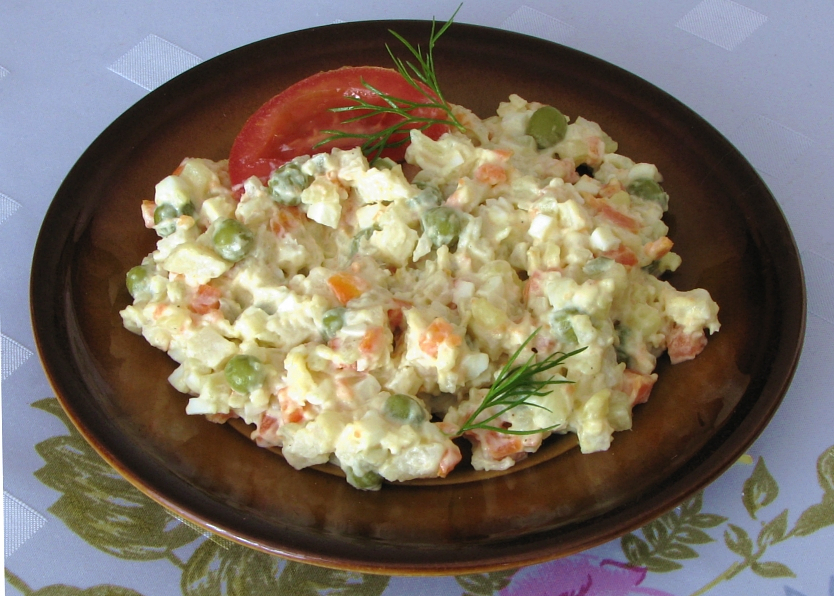
Sałatka jarzynowa (warzywna) z majonezem – vegetable salad with mayonnaise

=== Soups and dumplings ===
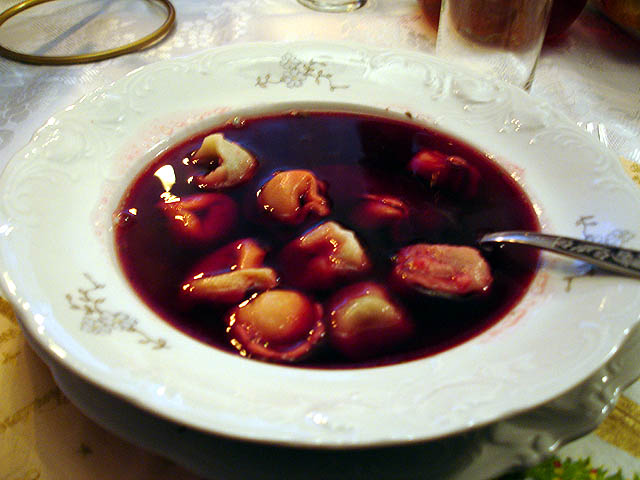
Barszcz z uszkami – beetroot soup with little dumplings. The soup is a staple part of the local culinary heritage of many Eastern and Central European nations

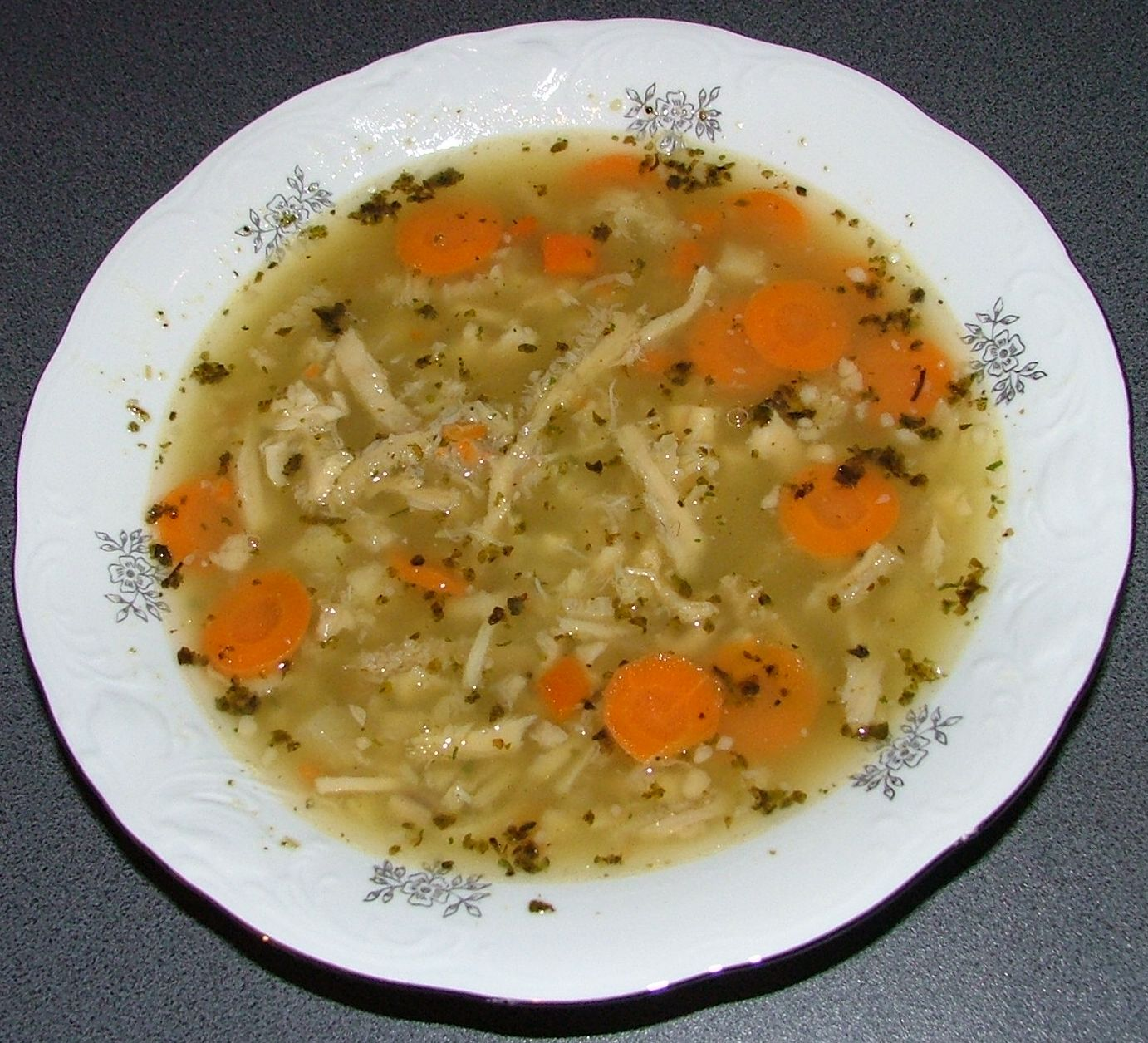
Flaki – tripe soup

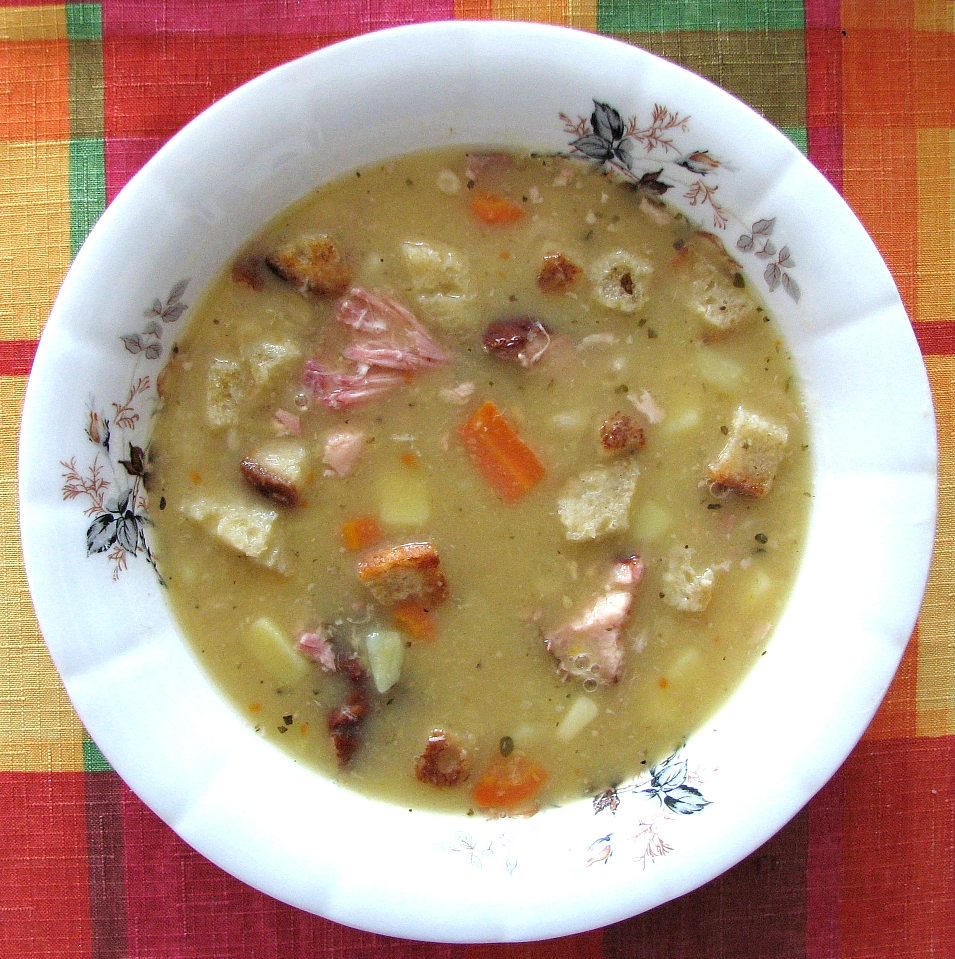
Grochówka – pea soup

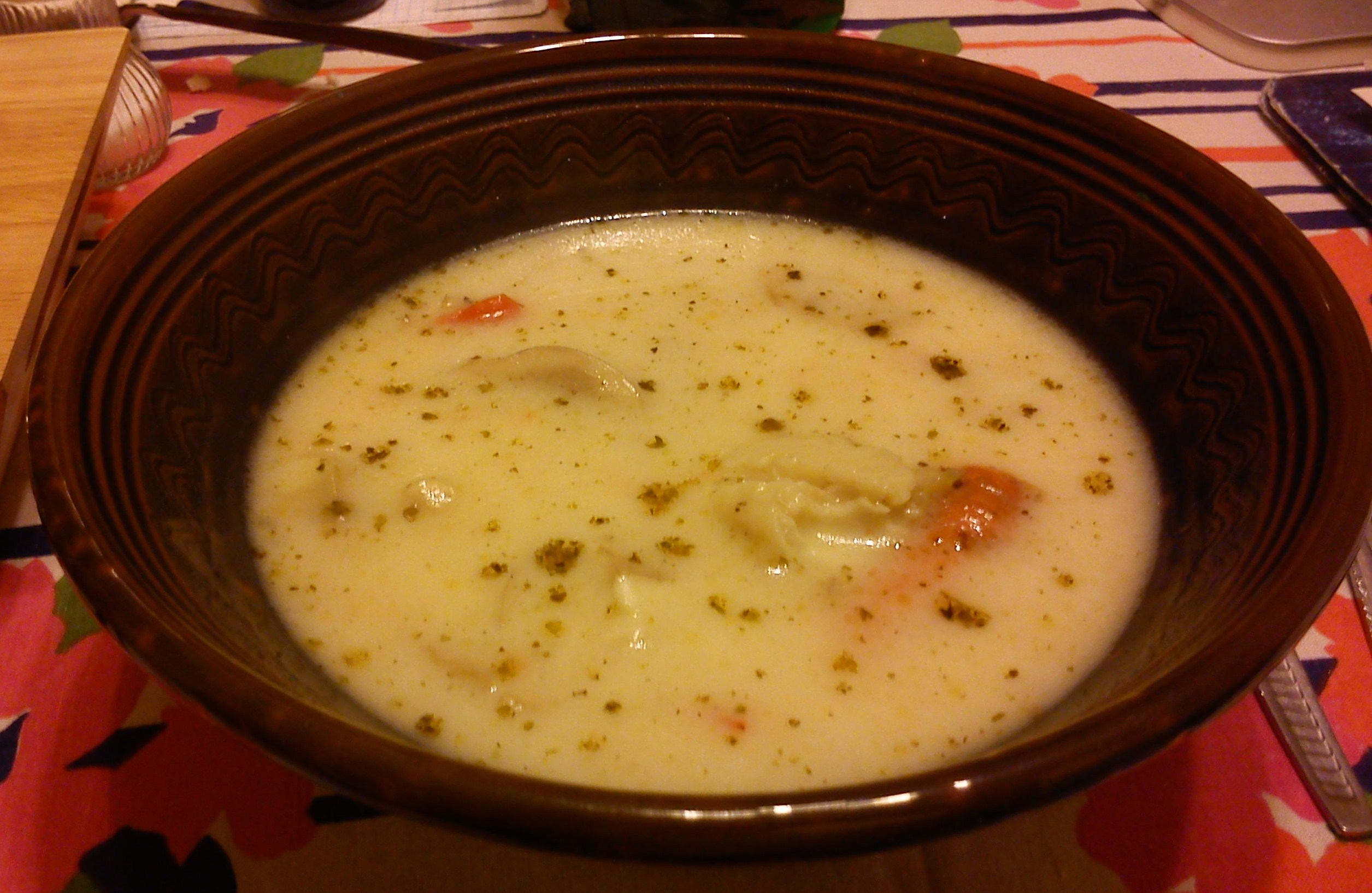
Zupa rybna – fish soup

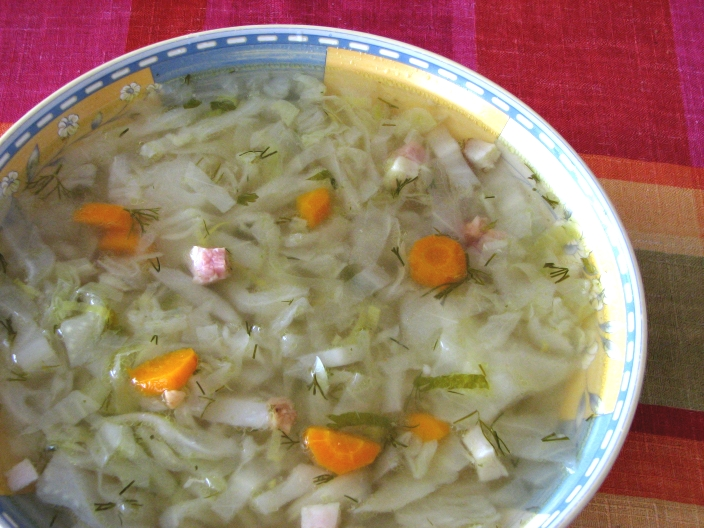
Kapusniak – cabbage soup

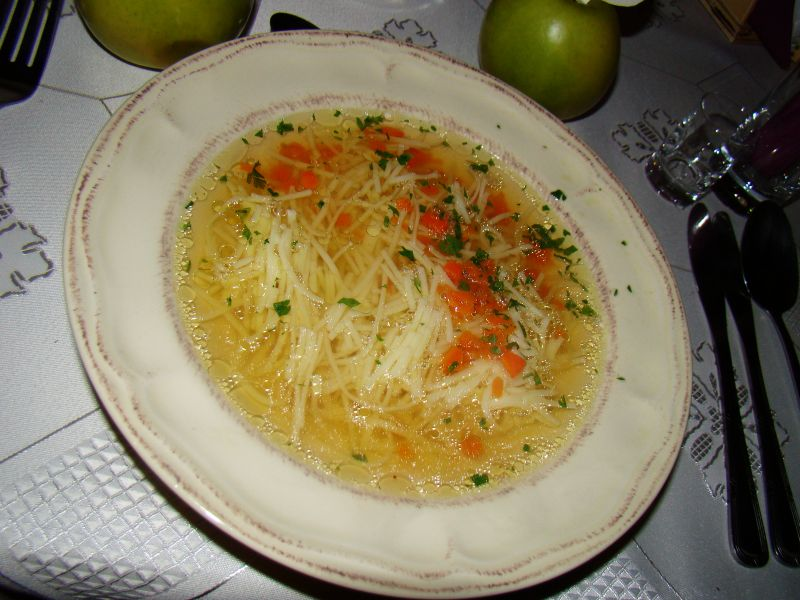
Rosół – chicken soup

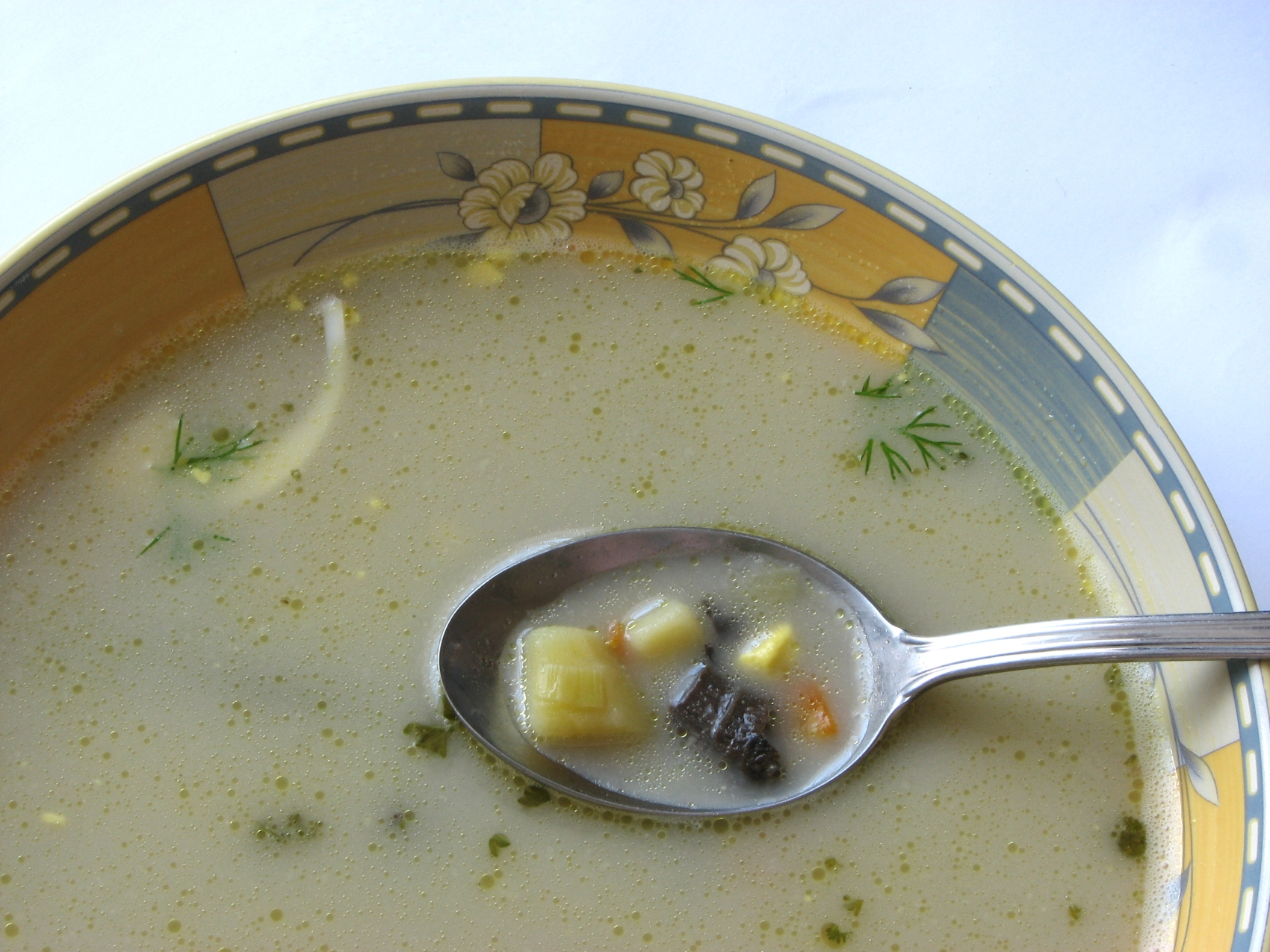
Zupa grzybowa – forest mushrooms soup

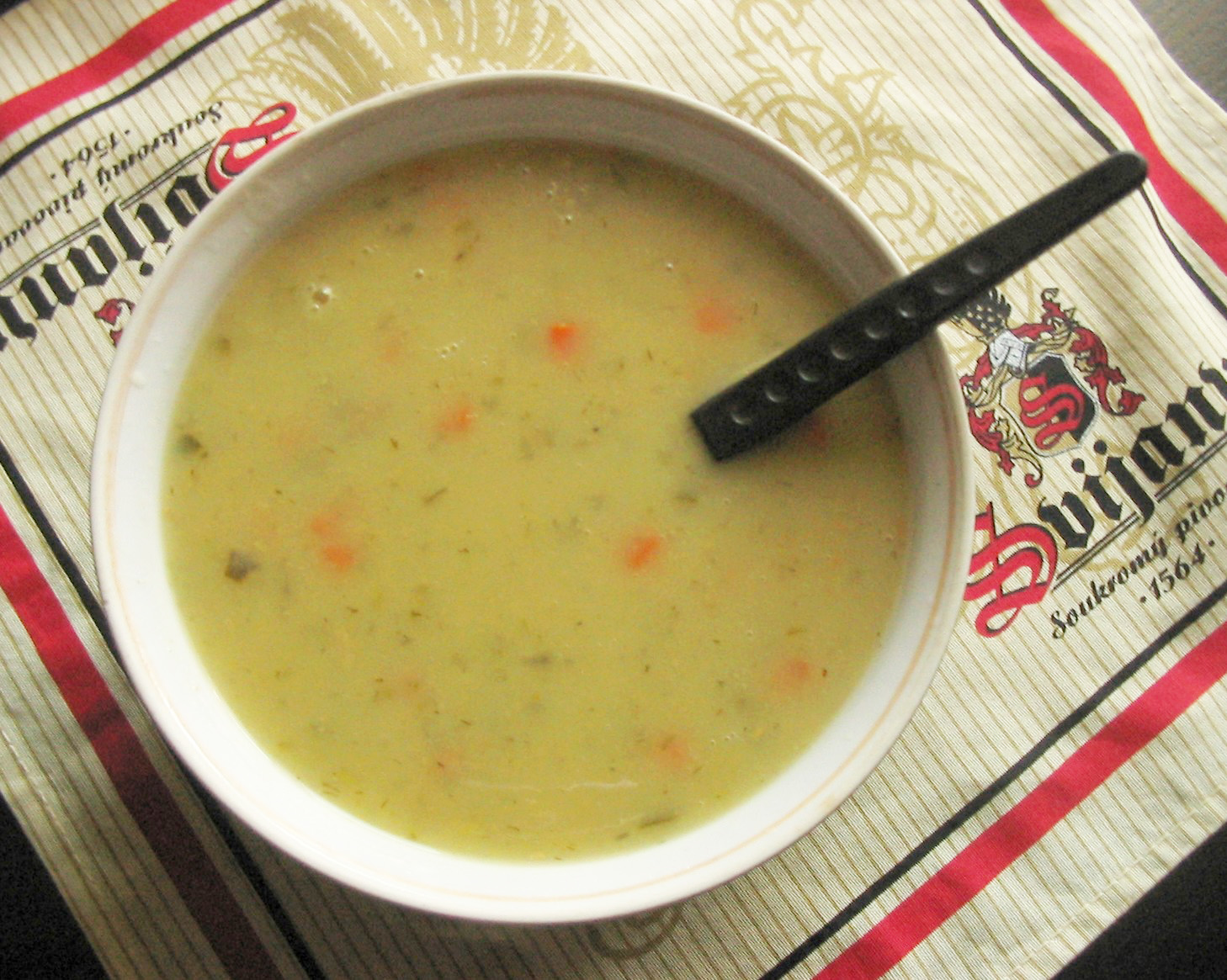
Zupa ogórkowa – cucumber soup

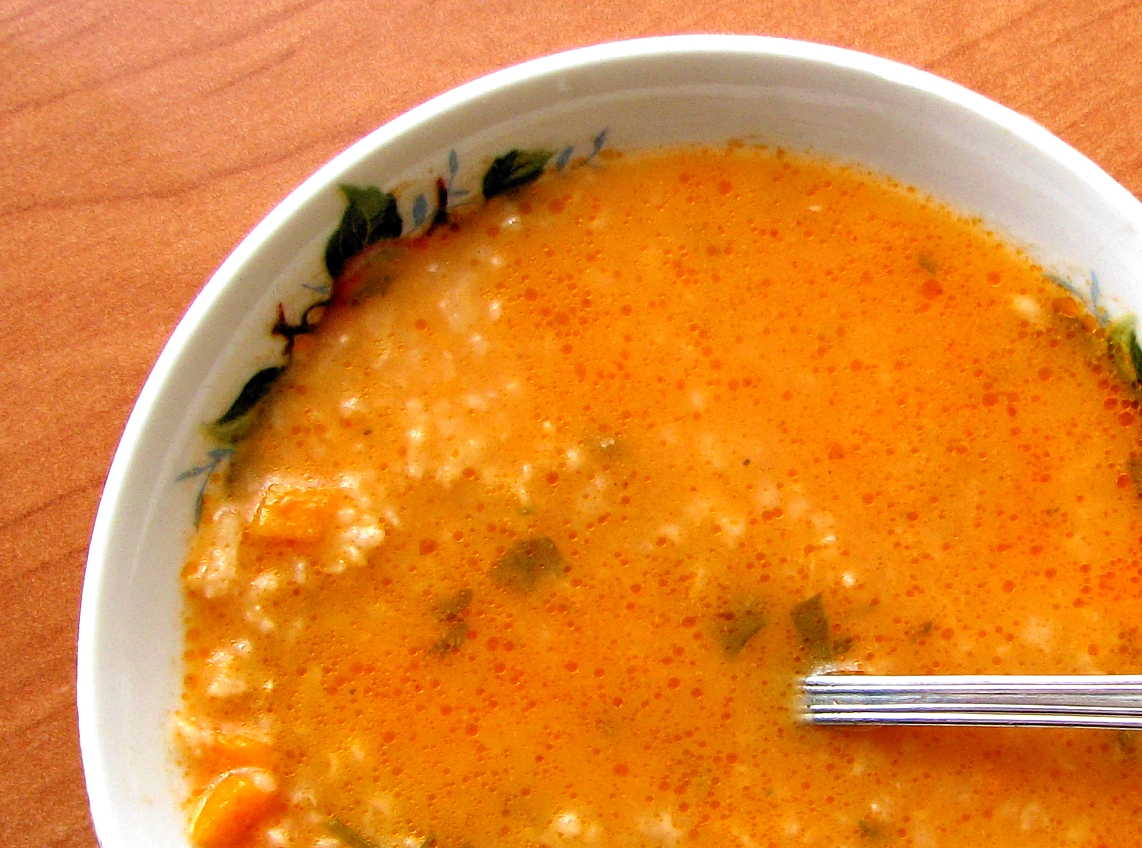
Zupa pomidorowa – tomato soup with rice

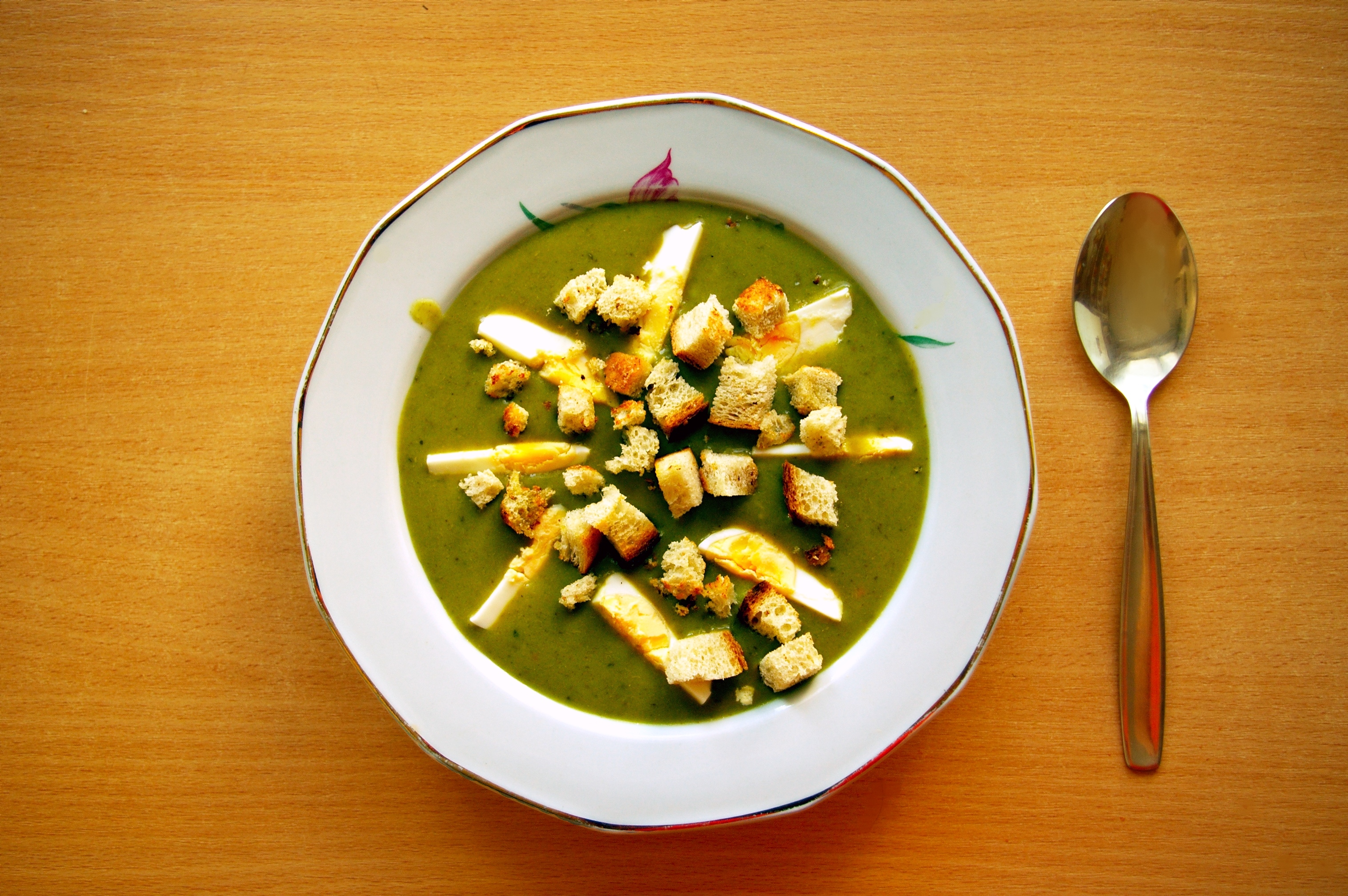
Zupa szczawiowa – sorrel soup

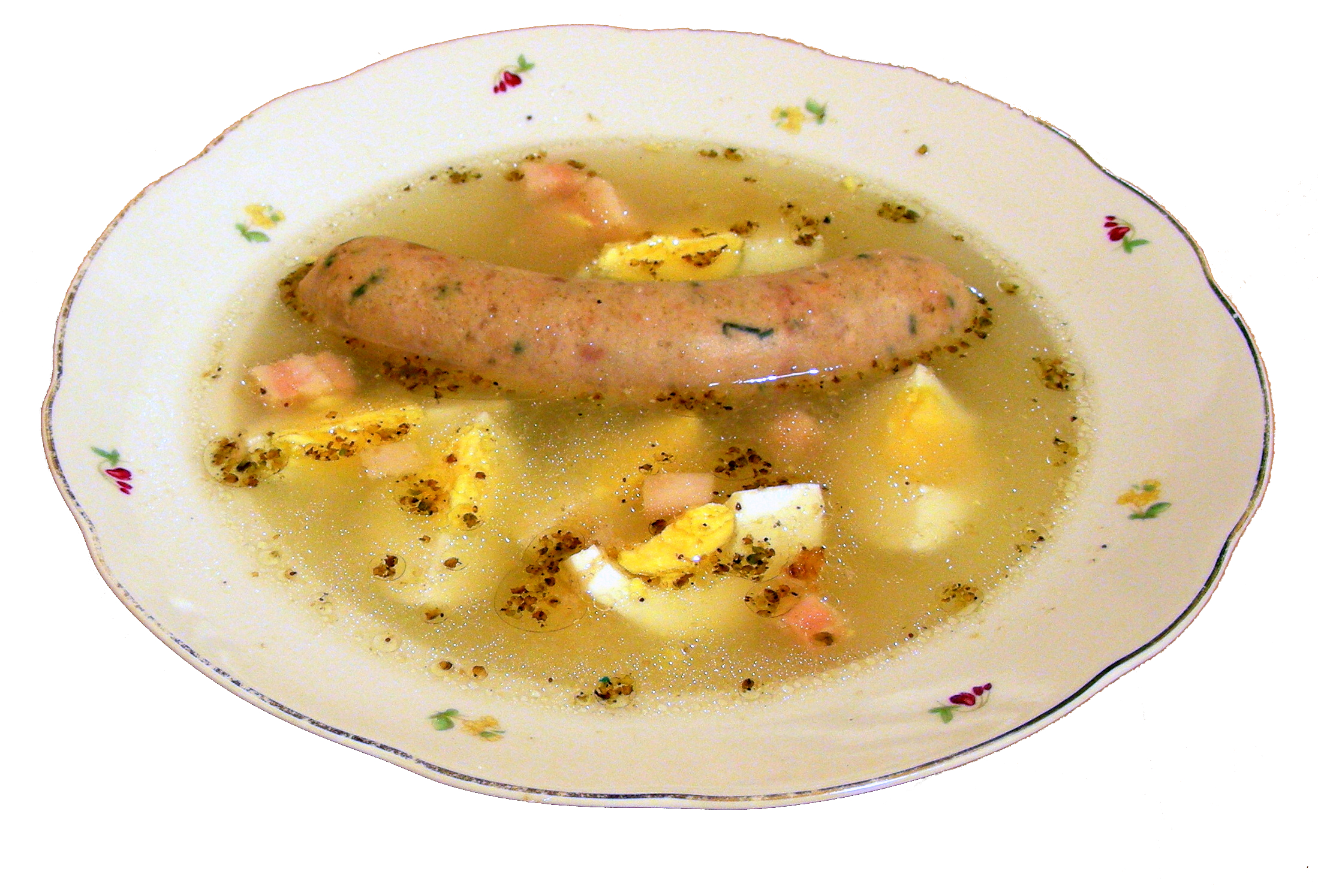
Żurek – rye flour sour soup

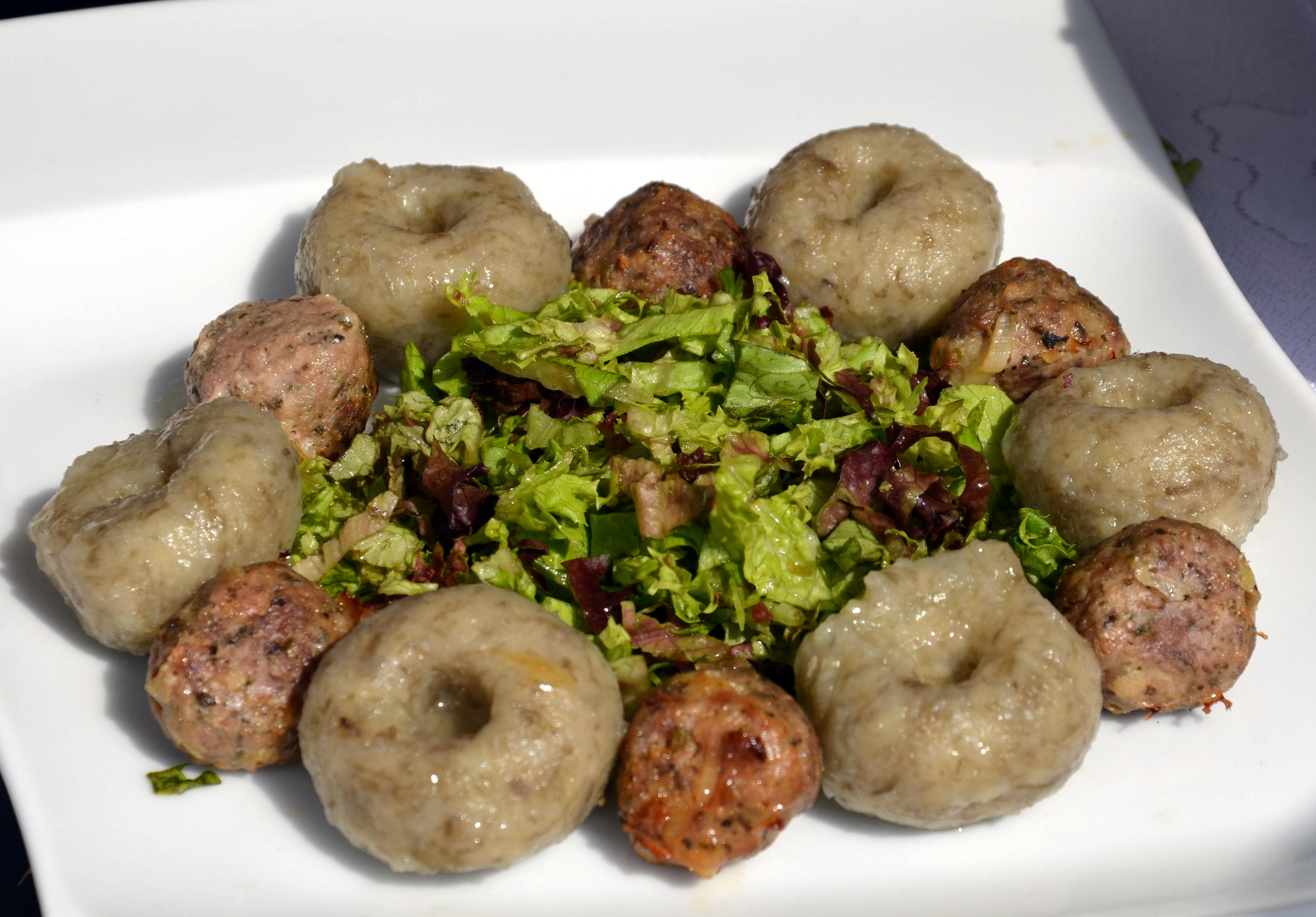
Kluski śląskie (silesian potato dumplings) served with meat balls

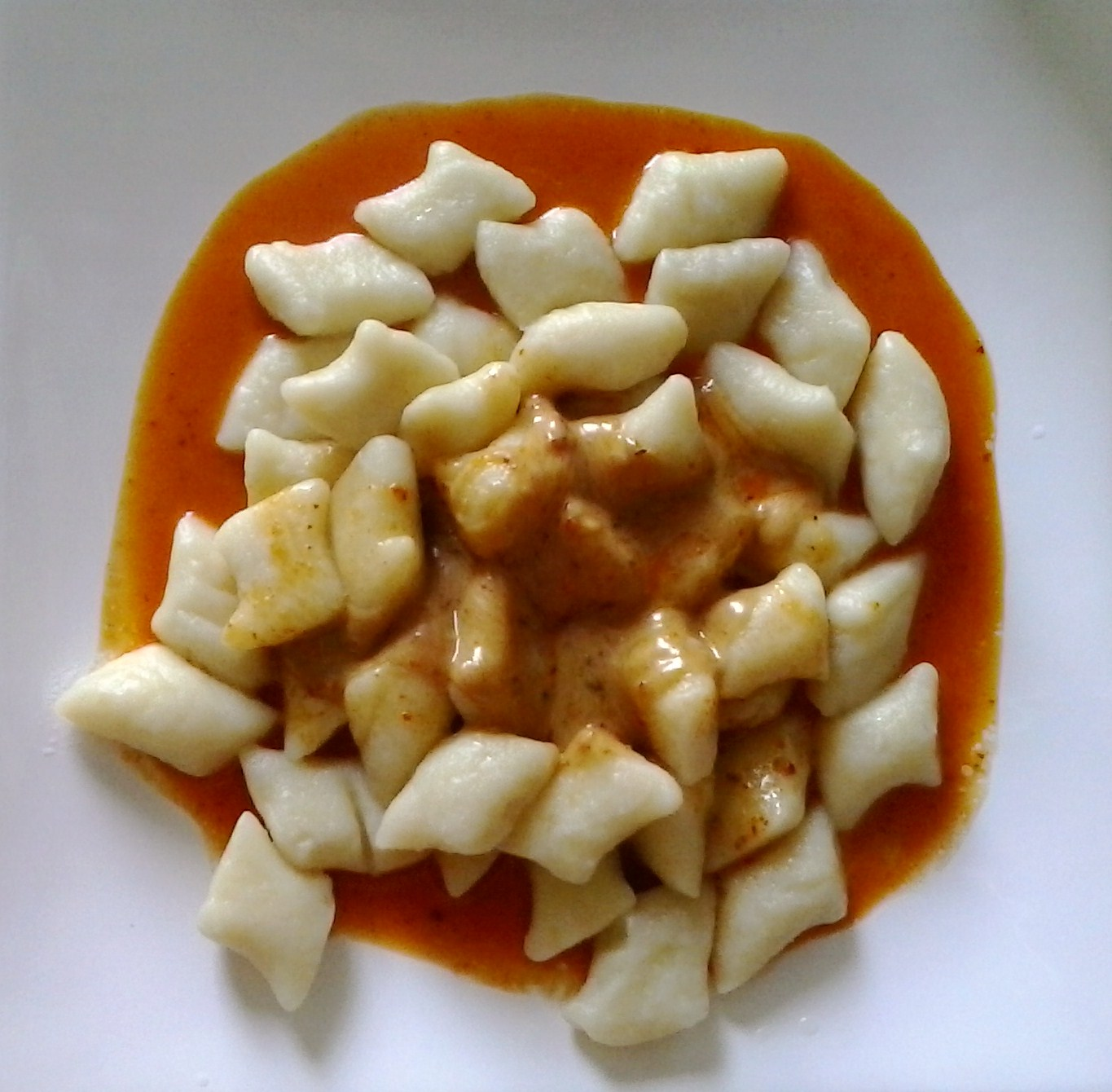
Kopytka – potato dumplings

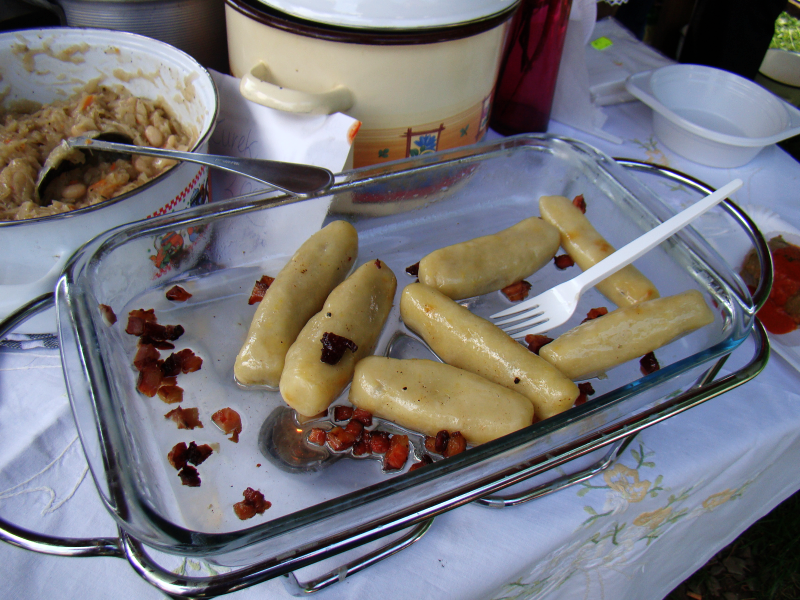
Kopytka – other version

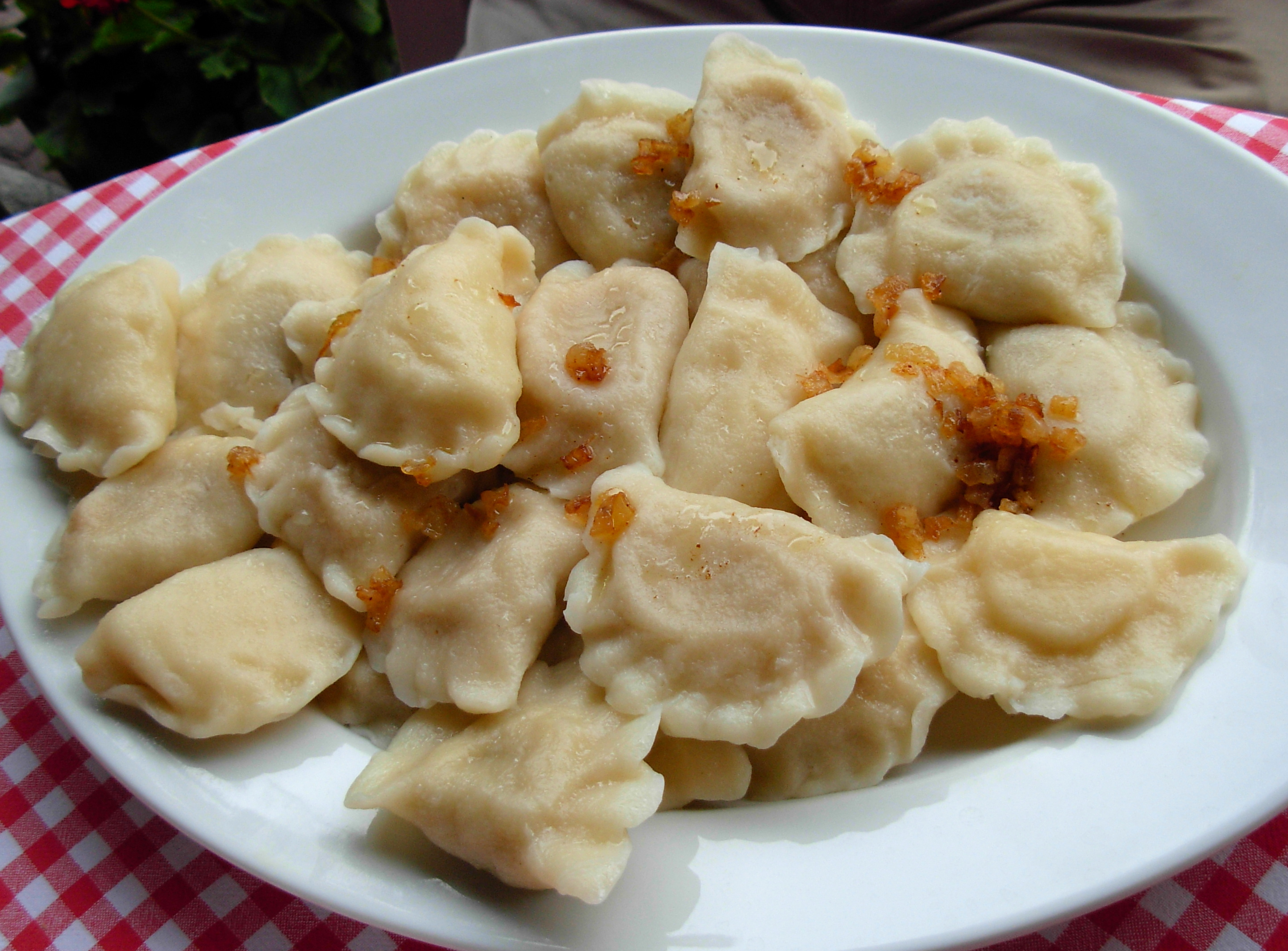
Pierogi – dumplings

=== Pancakes ===
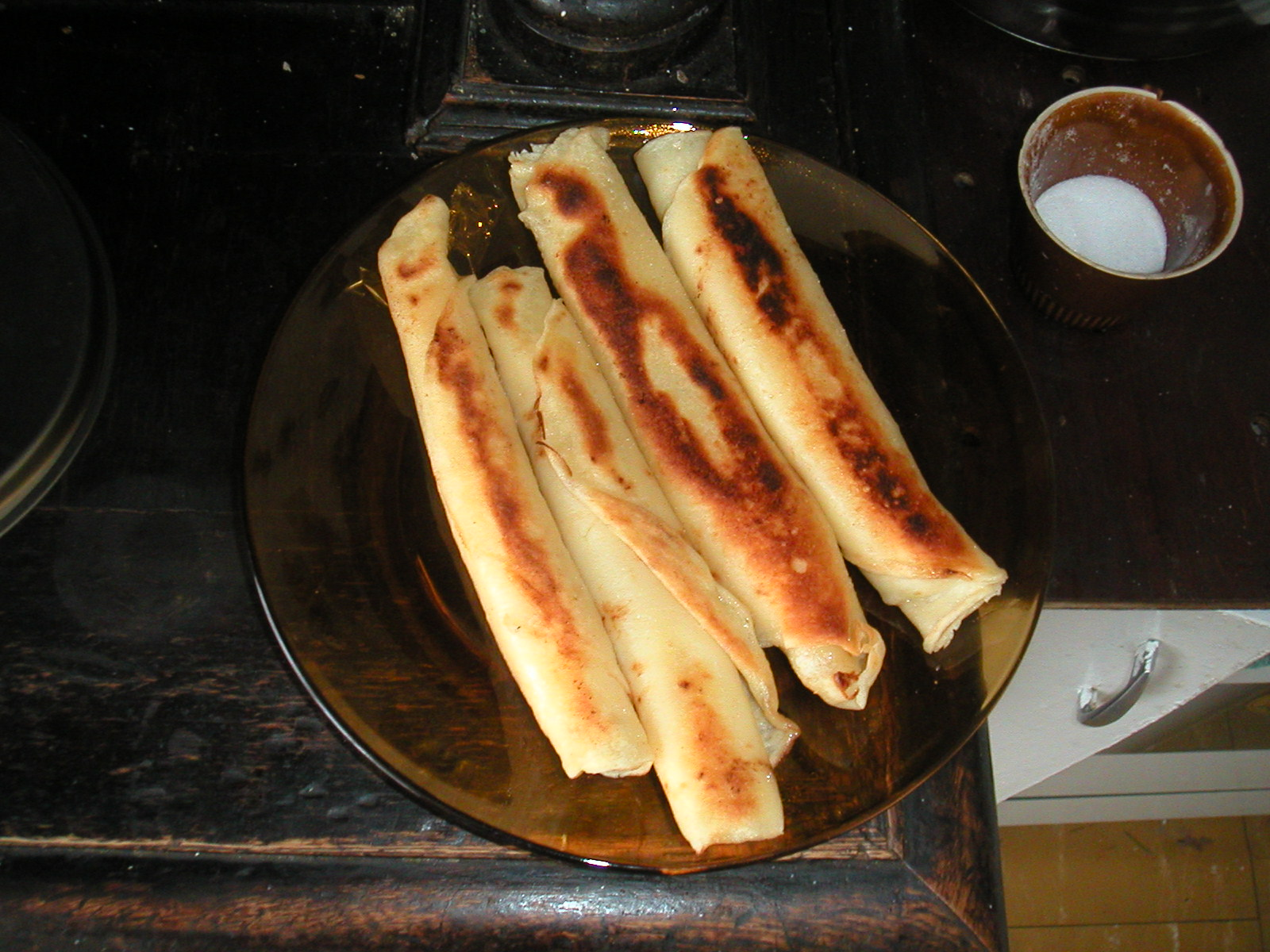
Naleśniki domowy – homemade crepes with sweet white cheese filling

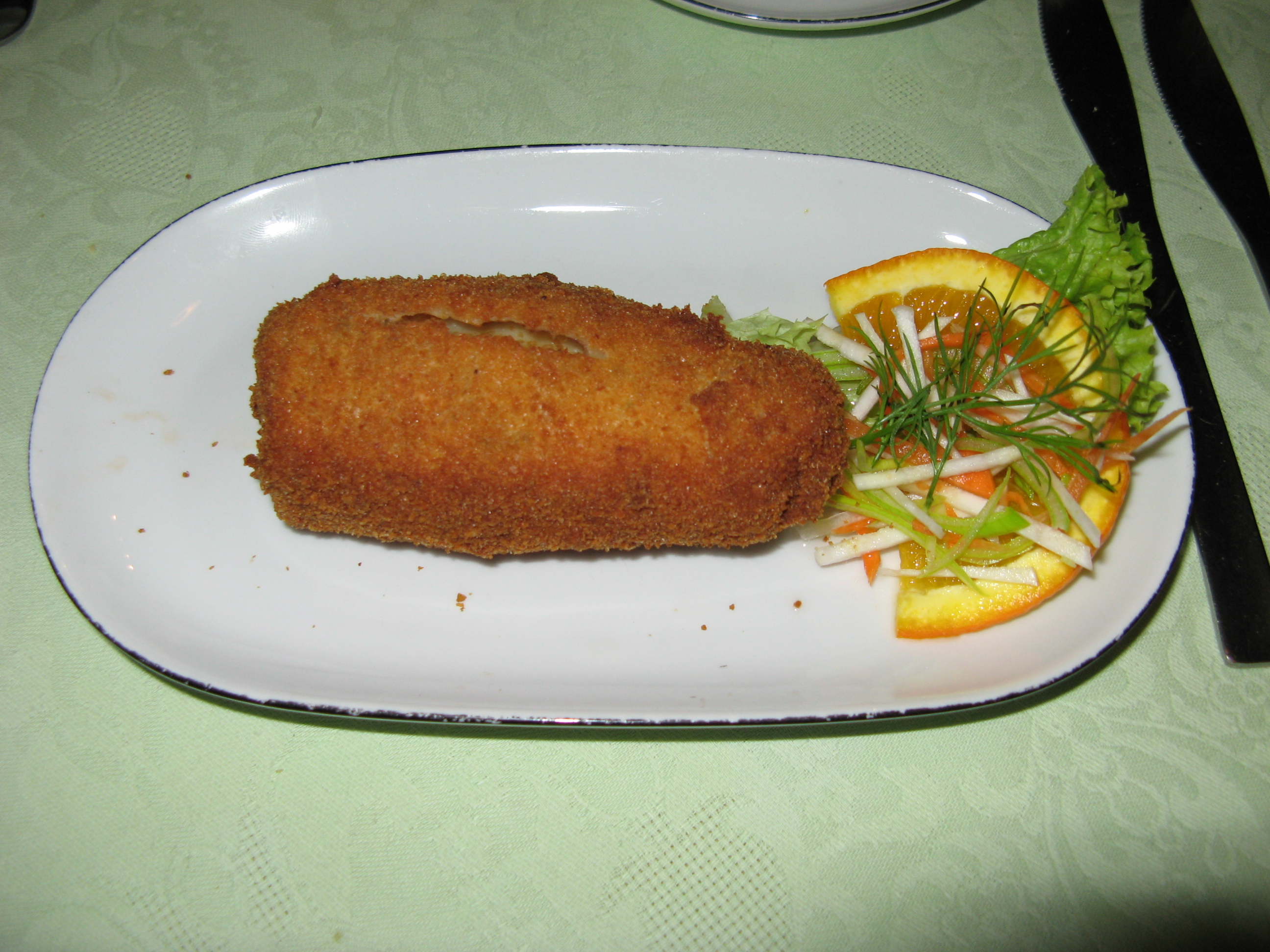
Krokiet – Polish croquette

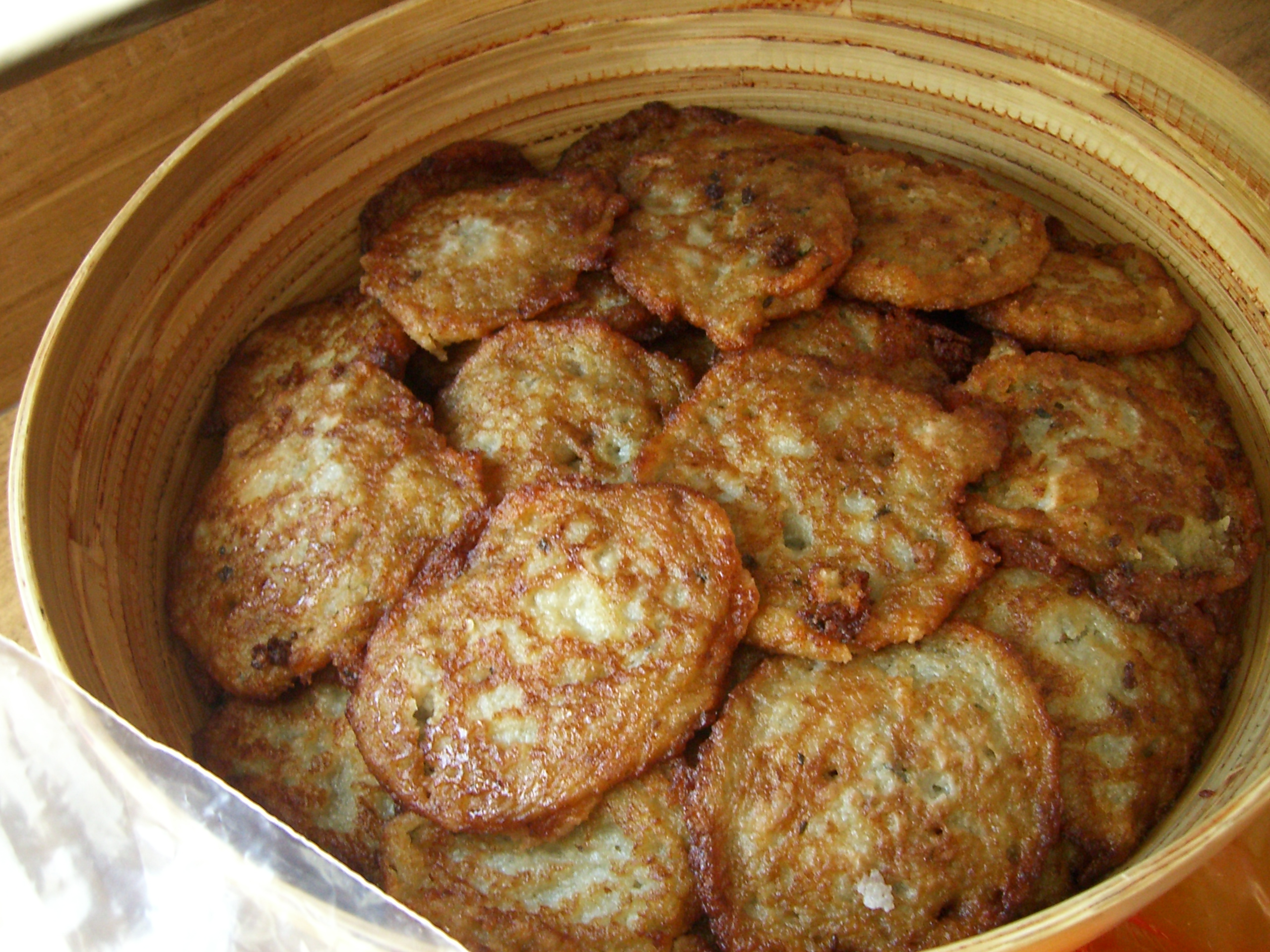
Potato pancakes

=== Kasha ===
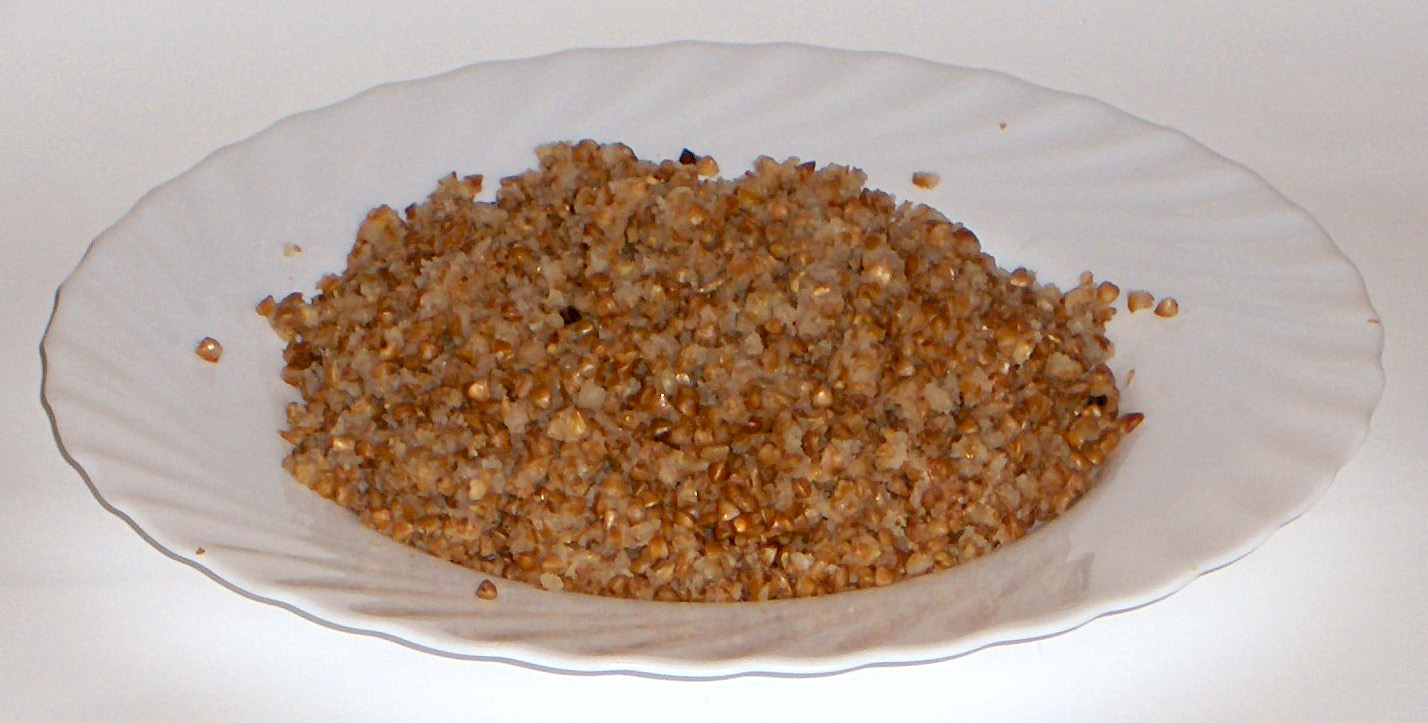
Kasza gryczana – cooked buckwheat groats (kasha)

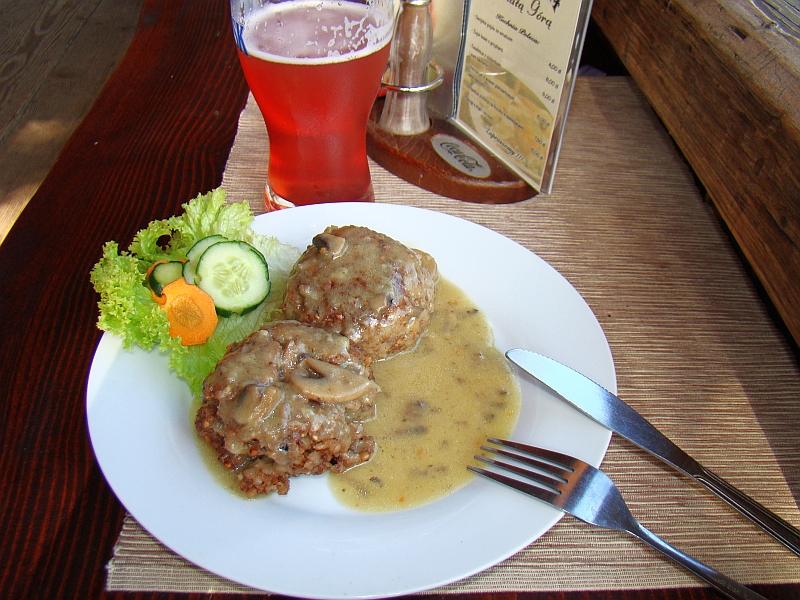
Hreczki (buckwheat and quark burgers) with a glass of beer

== See also ==
- List of Polish desserts
