= E. Wedel Chocolate Factory Museum =

Chocolate museum in Warsaw, Poland

- Muzeum Fabryka Czekolady E.Wedel
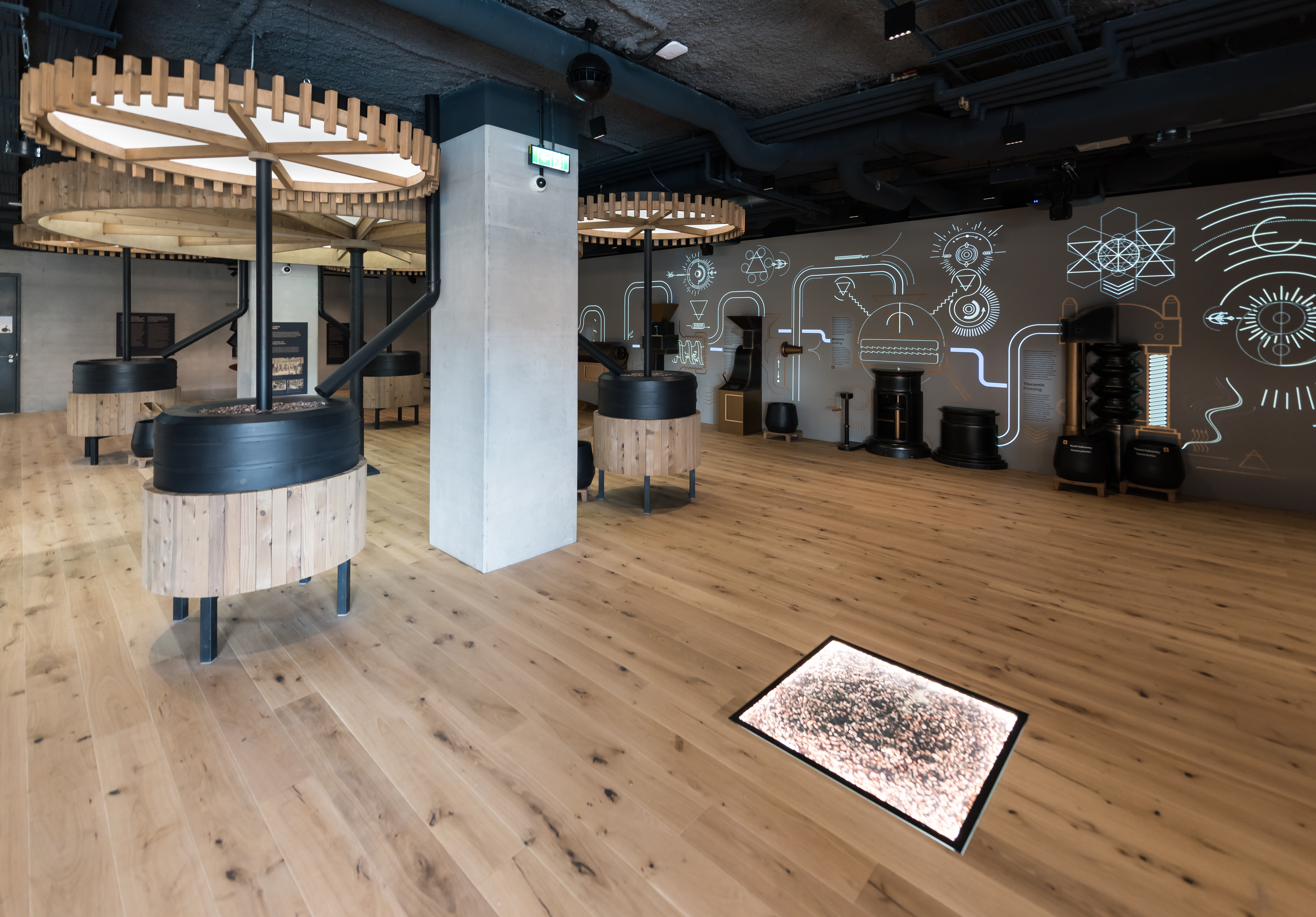
- Museum exhibition, August 2024
- Established: 4 September 2024
- Coordinates: 52.24611°N 21.05111°E
- Type: food museum, company museum
- Founder: E. Wedel
- Director: Robert Zydel
- Owner: E. Wedel
- Public transit access: 3 6 9 22 24 102 125 135 146 147
- Website: https://fabrykaczekolady.pl/

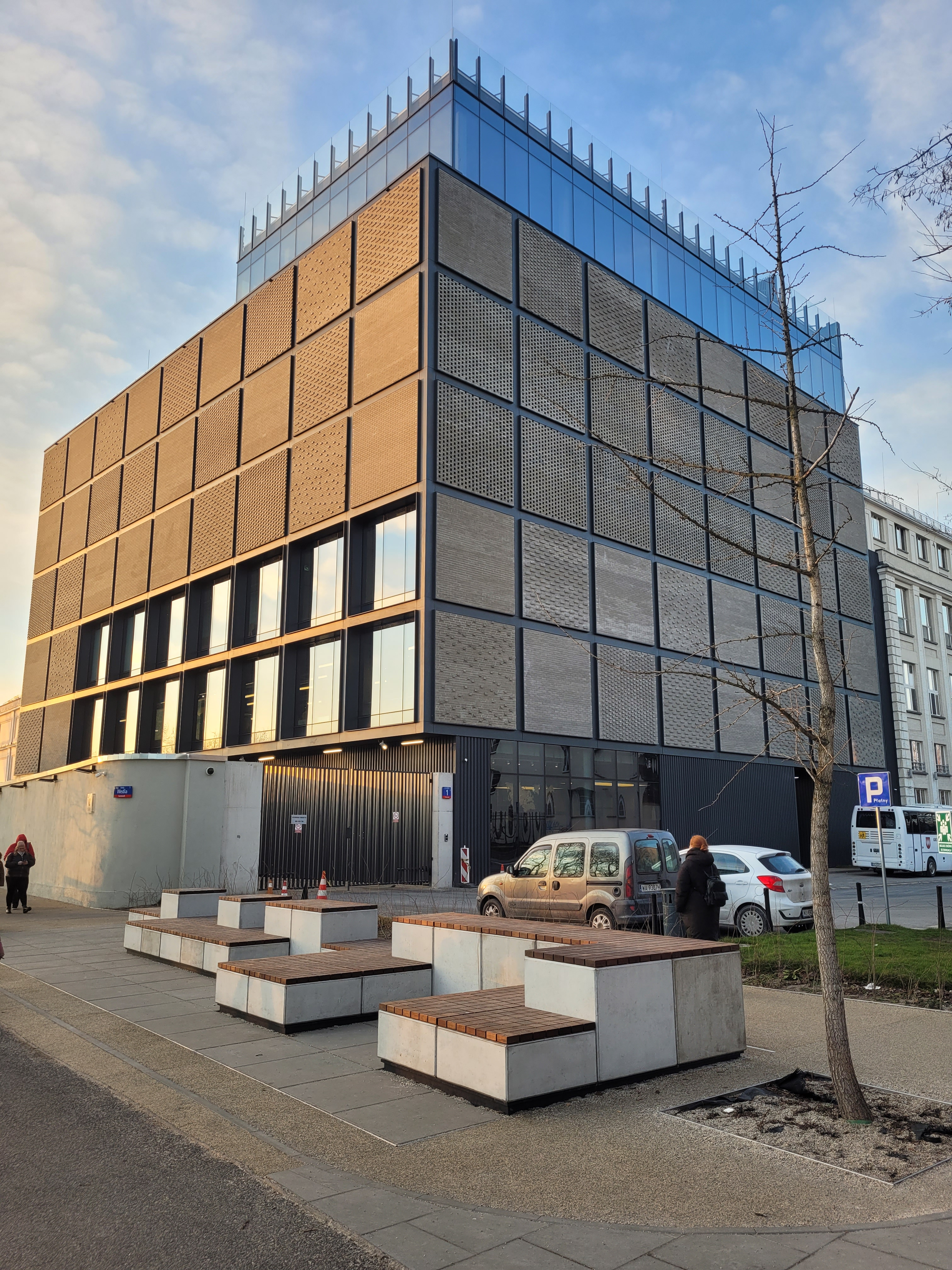
E. Wedel Chocolate Factory Museum, 2025

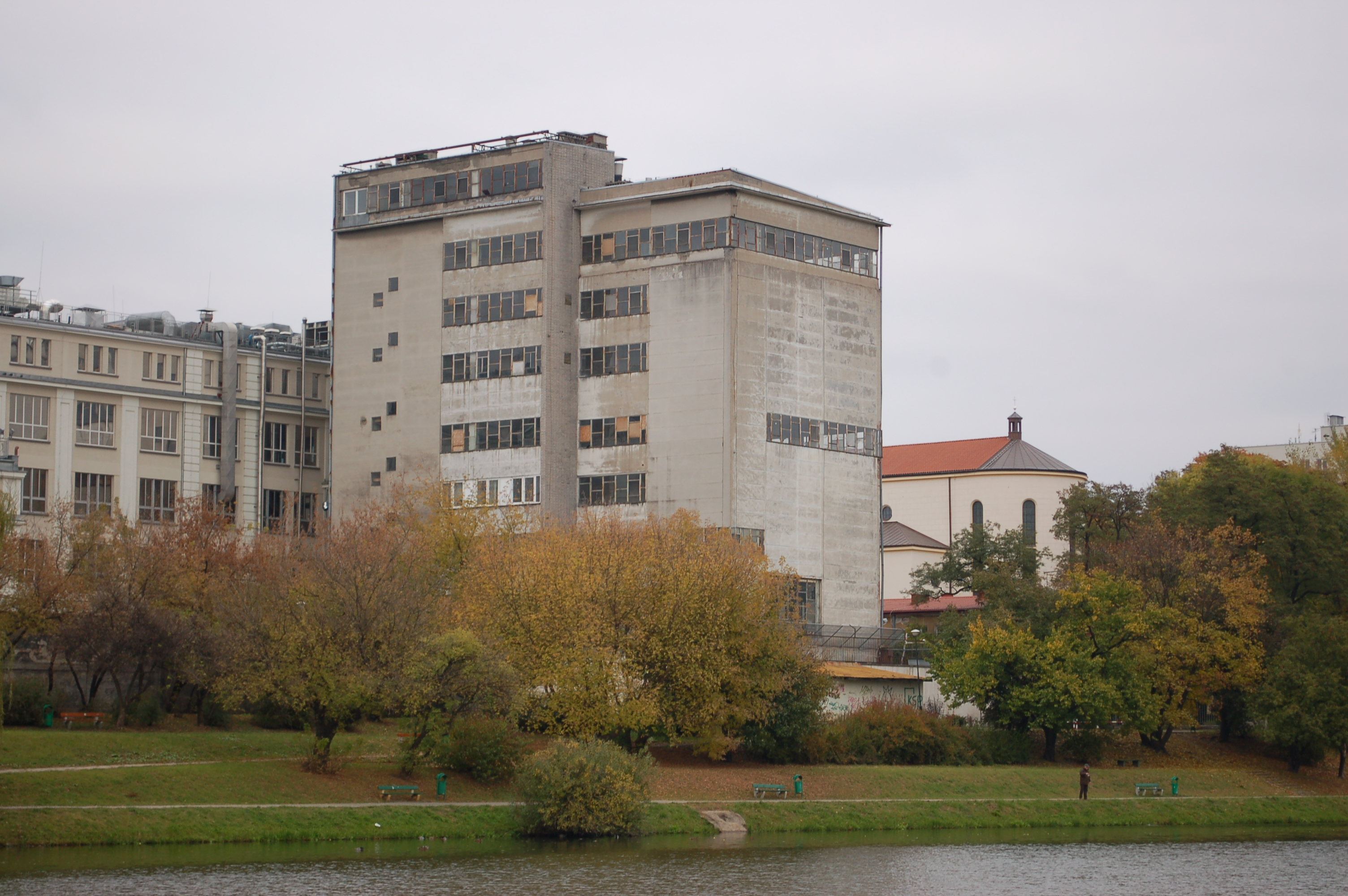
E. Wedel factory silos before rebuilding them into museum, 2011

The E. Wedel Chocolate Factory Museum (Muzeum Fabryka Czekolady E. Wedel) is an industrial and cultural museum located in the Praga-Południe district of Warsaw, Poland. Opened in September 2024, it is situated within the historic E. Wedel factory complex in the Kamionek neighbourhood, occupying a specifically repurposed building that formerly served as chocolate silos. With a total floor area of over 8,000 square metres.

The museum's permanent exhibition focuses on the history of the Wedel family (Karol Wedel and his descendants) and the brand's development since its founding in 1851, as well as the industrial history of chocolate manufacturing. The facility features a "bean-to-bar" production line, allowing visitors to observe the technological processes of chocolate making. The building was designed by the BIM Architects architectural studio and features a grey-brick facade with a repetitive, geometric relief pattern intended to resemble the texture of chocolate bar.

== History ==
The project was initiated in 2019 as part of a strategic investment to repurpose the factory's historical infrastructure. Details on the intent of the project to transform the former chocolate silos into a cultural institution and new company infrastructure were publicly unveiled in 2023. The museum officially opened to the public on 4 September 2024, a date selected to coincide with International Chocolate Day.

The development was recognized for its architectural and social impact on the Praga-Południe district, receiving the Architectural Prize of the Mayor of Warsaw (Nagroda Architektoniczna Prezydenta m.st. Warszawy) in 2024 in the commercial architecture category and audience award.

== Architecture and design ==
The museum is housed in a repurposed section of the Wedel factory complex – the former chocolate silos located on the banks of Kamionek Lake. The architectural transformation was designed by the Warsaw-based firm BIM Architekci. The project involved stripping most of the old factory silos from 1960's and encasing part of them in a new, contemporary shell.

=== Exterior ===
The building's facade is constructed from grey brick, featuring a repetitive, geometric relief pattern. This design was intended by the architects to reference the segmented texture of a chocolate bar while conforming with the historical brickwork of the neighbouring 1930s factory buildings. The structure maintains the verticality of the original silos, reaching a height of several stories, which makes it a recognizable landmark in the Praga-Południe skyline.

=== Interior and exhibition space ===
The interior design and the permanent exhibition were developed by the WWAA studio, known for its work on the Polish Pavilion at Expo 2010. The museum spans six floors, totaling over 8,000 m^{2} (86,000 sq ft). The layout was designed to be "multisensory," incorporating industrial elements such as exposed structural components and pipes alongside interactive installations.

== Exhibitions ==
The museum's permanent exhibition is distributed across several floors, focusing on the history of the Wedel family, the evolution of the brand, and the technical aspects of confectionery production. The exhibition is designed to be multisensory, engaging sight, smell, and touch.

The tour typically begins with a historical overview of cocoa cultivation and the origins of the E. Wedel company, founded in 1851. A significant portion of the gallery is dedicated to the Jan Wedel era (the 1930s), showcasing vintage packaging, advertising posters, and historical memorabilia that highlight the brand's Art Deco heritage (including Boy on zebra by Leonetto Cappiello).

Features of the exhibition include:

- chocolate-making process presented step-by-step, from selection of cocoa beans;
- history of Wedel family, and of their company;
- branding, advertising and design history of Wedel products, like ptasie mleczko;
- opportunity to observe live production of Wedel products, among them hand-made Torcik Wedlowski.

The top floor of the museum features a terrace overlooking Kamionek Lake.

== Awards ==
- 2024
  - Architectural Prize of the Mayor of Warsaw – two categories: commercial architecture and audience award
- 2025
  - Indigo Design Awards – category: Graphic Design: Wayfinding
  - Golden Pin Design Award – category: Communication Design
  - KTR Award – category: Design in Public Spaces
  - DNA Paris Design Awards – category: Communication Design
  - Red Dot Design Award – category: Spatial Communication: Signage and Wayfinding System
  - German Design Award – category: Signage and Wayfinding
