= Ptasie mleczko =

Polish candy

Bird's milk
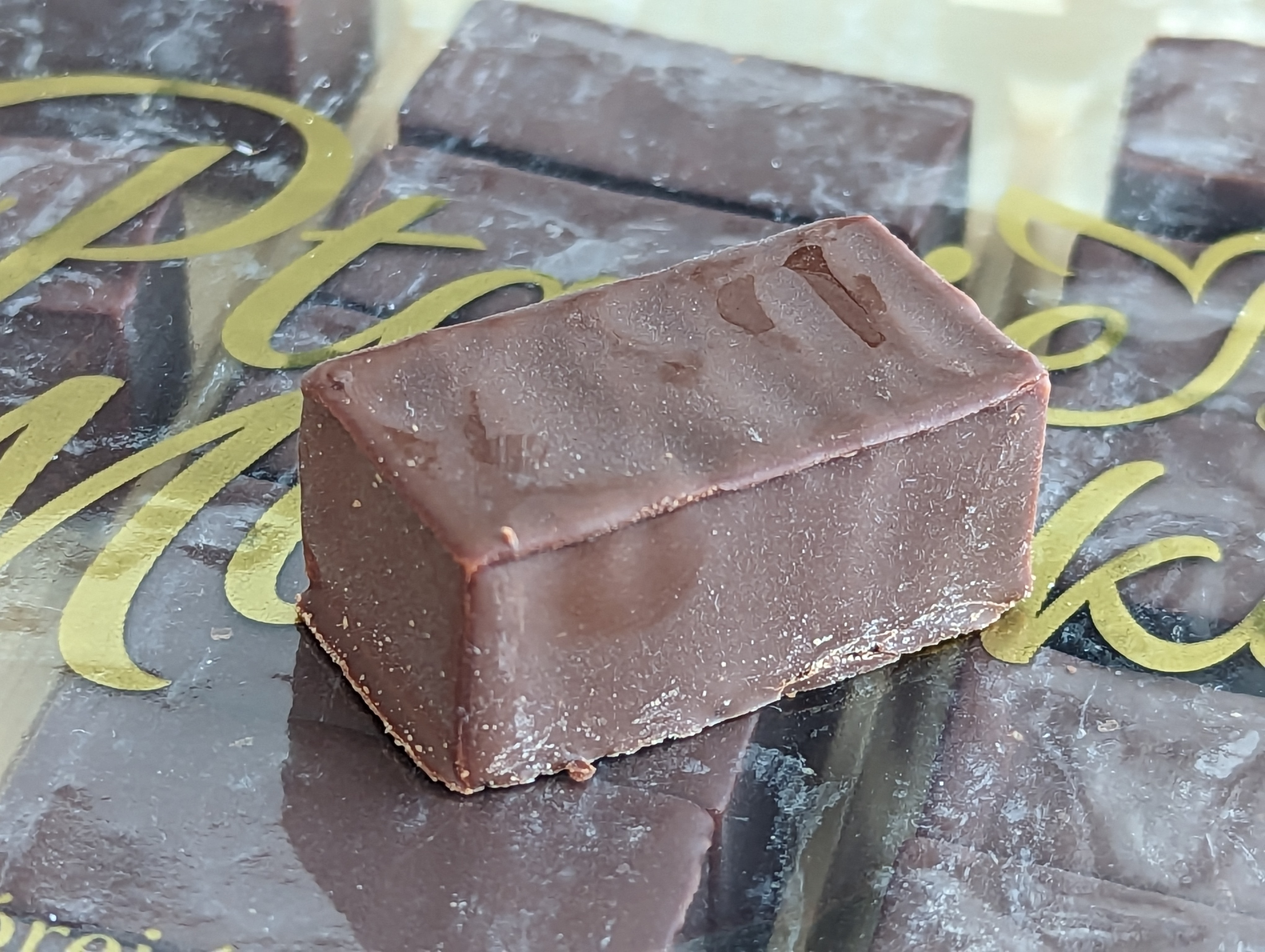
- Place of origin: Poland
- Created by: Jan Wedel (confectionery), Vladimir Guralnik (cake)
- Main ingredients: Sugar, chocolate, powdered milk, gelatin/agar-agar

Ptasie mleczko (Polish: [ˈptaɕɛ ˈmlɛt͡ʂkɔ]) or bird's milk is a confectionery originating in Poland as well as the name for a Soviet cake that was derived from the original Polish invention. It is a small, chocolate-covered bar with a soft marshmallow-like interior.

E. Wedel is one of the most recognized chocolate confectioneries in Poland, having exclusive rights for the name Ptasie mleczko. Its owner created the original "bird's milk" in 1936. Other confectionery producers also make similar candies named differently (e.g., Alpejskie mleczko, "Alpine milk"). Nonetheless, Ptasie mleczko is often used to refer to similar candies with vanilla, cream, lemon or chocolate flavour.

In Russia, ptichye moloko (птичье молоко) is both a popular candy and a famous soufflé cake derived from the Polish candy. The brand was introduced in the 1960s during the Soviet era, and continues to be used by companies operating the factories which produced these candies and cakes since that time. The confectionery is also produced in other post-Soviet states, such as Ukraine.

== Origin of the name ==
The concept of avian milk (Ancient Greek: ὀρνίθων γάλα, ornithon gala) stretches back to ancient Greece. Aristophanes uses "the milk of the birds" in the plays The Birds and The Wasps as a proverbial rarity. The expression is also found in Strabo's Geographica where the island of Samos is described as a blest country, to which those who praise it do not hesitate to apply the proverb that "it produces even bird's milk" (φέρει καί ὀρνίθων γάλα). A similar expression lac gallinaceum (Latin for chicken's milk) was also later used by Petronius (38.1) and Pliny the Elder (Plin. Nat. pr. 24) as a term for something of great rarity. The idiom later became common in many languages and appeared in Slavic folk tales. In one such tale, the beautiful princess tests the ardor and resourcefulness of her suitor by sending him out into the wilderness to find and bring back the one fantastical luxury she does not have: bird's milk. In the fairy tale Little Hare by Aleksey Remizov (who wrote many imitations of traditional Slavic folk tales), the magic bird Gagana produces milk.

Whether any of these authors were aware of crop milk from some species of birds is unknown.

== History and variations ==
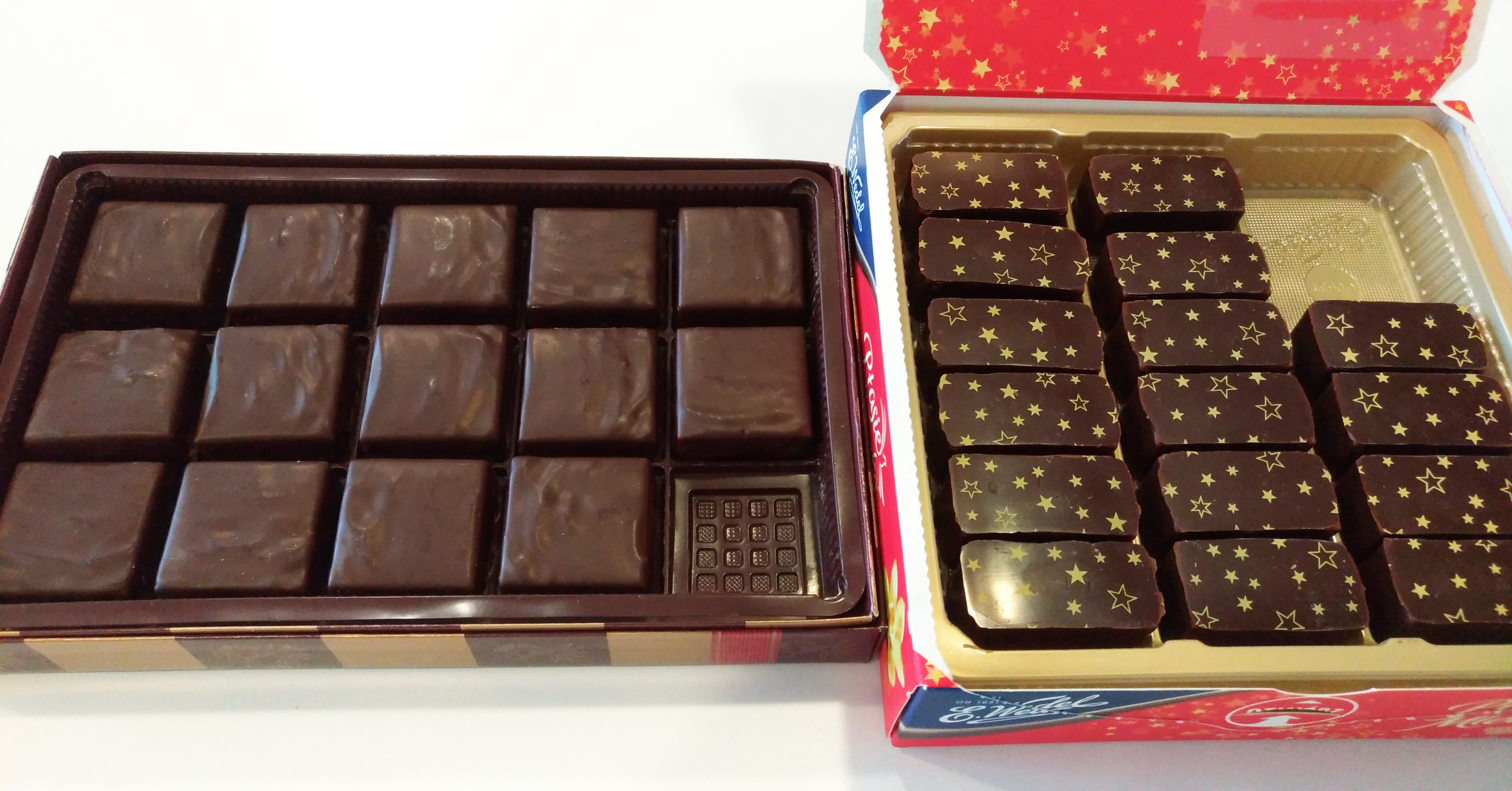
Bird's milk produced by Rot Front (left) and E. Wedel (right)

Bird's milk was first created in 1936 in Poland by Jan Wedel, owner of the E. Wedel Company. According to the company's official history, Wedel's inspiration for the name of the confectionery came from his voyages to France, when he asked himself: "What could bring greater happiness to a man who already has everything?" Then he thought: "Maybe only bird milk." In 2024, Lotte Wedel opened the E. Wedel Chocolate Factory Museum in Warsaw, dedicated to the history of chocolate-making and the Wedel brand. The museum includes a dedicated room devoted entirely to Ptasie Mleczko, where visitors can design their own packaging for the candy.

In Russia, ptichye moloko was originally a type of confectionery introduced in 1967 in Vladivostok and in 1968 by the Rot Front factory in Moscow. It became a hit, and mass production was started in 1975 by the Krasny Oktyabr confectionery factory in Moscow.

In Estonia, linnupiim (also bird's milk in Estonian) is the brand name of a similar candy made by the Kalev candy factory. This candy also uses agar-agar instead of gelatin as a thickening agent and comes in three flavors: chocolate, vanilla, and lemon. In 2021, a special edition with grapefruit flavor was produced.

In Moldova, lapte de pasăre (also bird's milk in Romanian) is the brand name of a similar candy made by the Bucuria candy factory. Despite the name, the candy is not to be confused with the Romanian traditional dessert lapte de pasăre.

In Lithuania, paukščių pienas (also bird's milk in Lithuanian) is the brand name of a similar candy made by the Vilniaus Pergalė factory.

=== Bird's milk cake ===
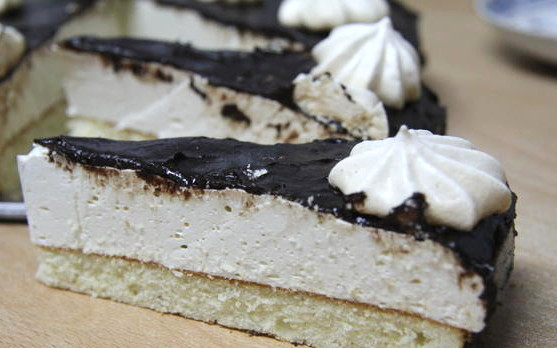
A homemade bird's milk cake

In 1978, the popular candy was transformed into a cake by Vladimir Guralnik in Moscow's Praga Restaurant. This was a light sponge cake filled with an airy soufflé and topped with chocolate glaze. A distinct feature of the Russian recipe is the usage of agar-agar instead of gelatin as a thickening agent, which withstands the high temperature needed to melt down sugar into a syrup. Initially, the restaurant produced trial batches of 20–30 cakes, but after six months the daily output was increased to 500 cakes. The recipe was quickly copied by other restaurants in Moscow, such as Moskva, Budapesht, and Ukraina. In the 1980s, a special factory for Bird's milk cakes was built in the Novye Cheryomushky district in the south of Moscow. Both the cake and the candy versions of the bird's milk are widely available to this date in supermarkets and specialty stores all over Russia.

== Trademarks ==
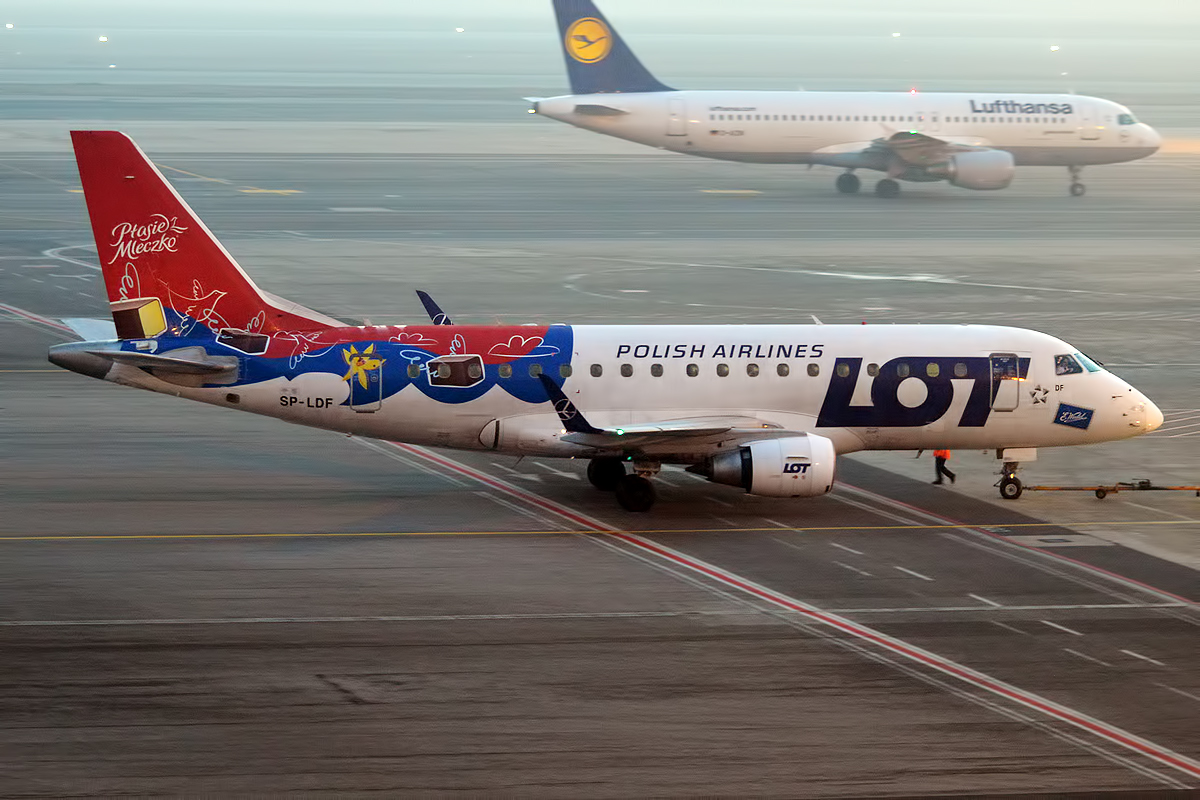
E. Wedel's Ptasie mleczko advertisement livery of a LOT airliner

Lapte de pasăre, Ptasie Mleczko, Ptiche moloko, and Vogelmilch are registered trademarks in the EU.

In Russia, Птичье молоко is a registered trademark of Rot Front, a member of United Confectioners. Other companies have been sued for using the name, even if they had used it in the Soviet Union.

== See also ==
- List of chocolate-covered foods
- List of Polish desserts
