= Solbus Solcity 12 LNG =

Fully low-floor single-decker bus manufactured by Sollus SA

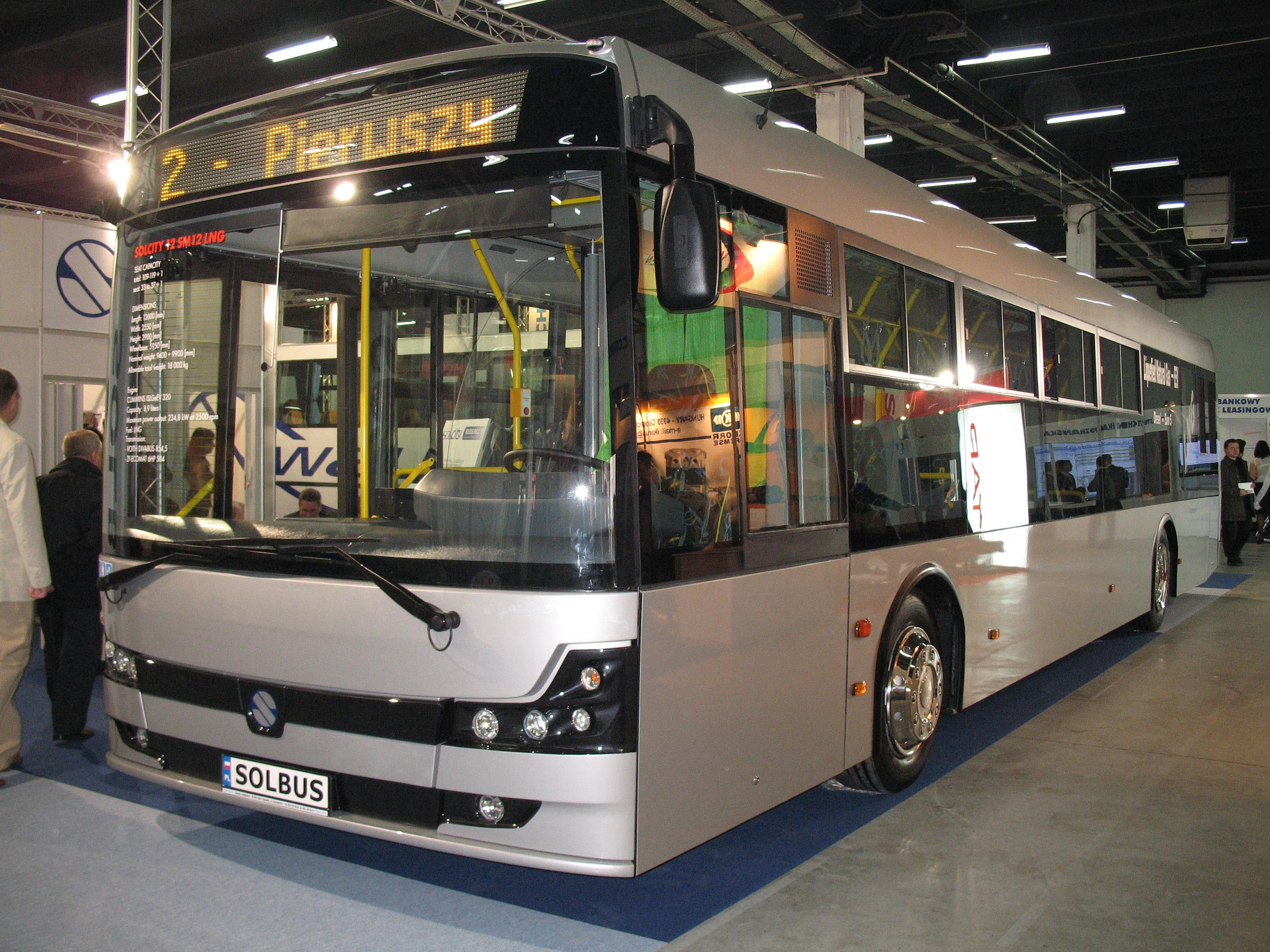
Solbus Solcity 12 LNG

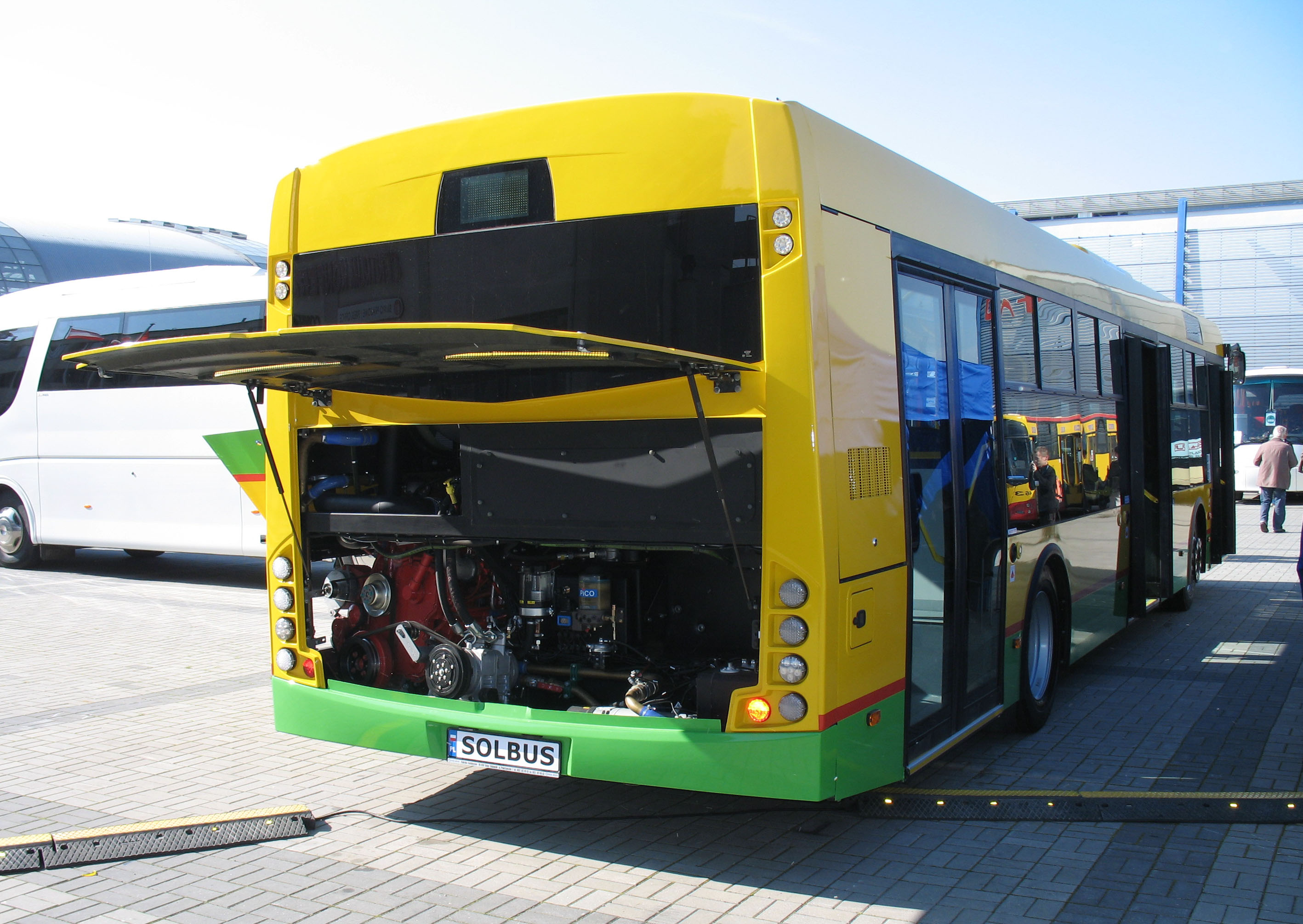
Back side and LNG engine of the bus

The Solbus Solcity 12 LNG is a fully low-floor single-decker bus manufactured by Solbus SA in Poland. The bus is the first to be powered by liquid natural gas in Mainland Europe. Fueling the bus takes 3–5 minutes.

The first LNG Solcity's were produced in 2010; the model was perfected at the end of 2011. In 2012, the bus was exhibited in the Hannower IAA motor show.

== Technical sheets ==
Chassis	Solcity 12
Length	12 315 mm
Width	2 550 mm
Seats	53-55
Doors	3 (2-2-2) (2-2-0) - option (2-0-2) - option (2-2-1) - option
Passengers	105-119
Maximum weight	18 000 kg
