= Babayevsky (company) =

Russian confectionery manufacturer

- Company type: Public
- Industry: Confectionery
- Founded: 1804; 222 years ago
- Headquarters: Moscow, Russia
- Key people: Sergey Nosenko
- Products: Candy, chocolate, caramel
- Number of employees: over 15,000
- Website: www.babaev.ru

OAO Konditerskiy Kontsern Babayevskiy Open Joint-Stock Company (Russian: Открытое акционерное общество "Кондитерский концерн Бабаевский") is the oldest Russian confectionery manufacturer and a member of United Confectioners holding company. It is located in Moscow (Malaya Krasnoselskaya St., 7).

== History ==
The factory conducts history since 1804 as a family workshop of the confectioners Abrikosovy. In 1918 it was nationalized. Its current name was received only in 1922 in honor of Peter Akimovich Babayev, chairman of the Sokolniki District Executive Committee. In 1993 it was privatized. In 2002, after the bankruptcy of Inkombank, the controlling interest in the concern was sold to the Amidis LLC for 800 million rubles.

It is named after the Soviet revolutionary of Azerbaijani descent Pyotr (Peter) Babayev.

== Babaevsky Confectionery Concern ==
In July 1992, the factory was privatized and became an open joint stock company. In 1998, after the merger of a number of regional confectionery factories, JSC Babaevsky Confectionery Concern was established.

In 2002 after the bankruptcy of Inkombank, the controlling stake in the concern was sold to Amidis LLC for 800 million rubles. In 2003, the Babaevsky Concern became part of the United Confectioners holding, which also includes the well-known factories Krasny Oktyabr, Rot Front, etc. In 2008 the Babaevsky Concern was certified in accordance with the requirements of the new international International Organization for Standardization 22,000 system. In 2012 the Babaevsky Concern received the GOST R ISO 9001-2008 certificate.

== See also ==
- Food industry of Russia
