= Babayevsky =

Babayevsky (masculine), Babayevskaya (feminine), or Babayevskoye (neuter) may refer to:

- Babayevsky District, a district of Vologda Oblast, Russia
- Babayevsky (company), Russian confectionery manufacturer
- Babayevskaya, a rural locality (village) in Kirov Oblast, Russia
