= Buses in Warsaw =

Overview of bus transit in Warsaw

Overview
- Locale: Warsaw, Poland
- Transit type: Public bus transport
- Number of lines: 288 (43 night lines)
- Annual ridership: 403 million (2022)
- Website: Warsaw Public Transport

Operation
- Began operation: 1920-1925 1929
- Operator: Various companies (see below) under contract to ZTM Warszawa
- Number of vehicles: MAN Lion's City, Solaris, Mercedes-Benz

Buses in Warsaw was introduced in 1920. Since 1994, services have been managed by Zarząd Transportu Miejskiego w Warszawie (ZTM Warszawa), and operated by various companies under contract.

== History ==
=== Interwar period ===
In 1920, a decision was made to establish the Bus Division within the Warsaw Tramways. Initially, the routes were served by Saurer double-decker buses.

During the defense of Warsaw in 1920, buses were used to transport troops. By the end of 1921, there were five bus routes in operation, but as new tram lines were built, these routes were quickly phased out in favor of trams. The bus service was also unprofitable. In 1925, the last Line 3 was discontinued, and for four years, city buses disappeared from the streets of Warsaw.

The buses were reintroduced in 1928. In the late 1920s, many new routes were introduced (by September 1939, there were up to 23 regular lines), and a new bus depot was opened on Łazienkowska Street. In 1938, modern bus stop signs were introduced. Before the outbreak of World War II, Warsaw had 180 buses.

=== Second World War ===
During the first days of Siege of Warsaw in September 1939, bus service continued without major changes. On September 6, bus service was suspended. Following Roman Umiastowski’s radio appeal calling on men capable of fighting to leave Warsaw, approximately 80 buses departed the city. The remaining fleet, which had not been damaged by shelling or bombing, was used by the military for transport and support purposes.

Bus service was restored on 3 October 1939, initially on the route from Teatralny Square to Savior Square. Over the next dozen or so days, additional routes were launched, though their sole purpose was to replace the trams until the tram network could be rebuilt.

== Operation ==
As of 2022, there are 302 bus lines in Warsaw and the surrounding areas, covering 4548 km.

=== Operators ===
- Miejskie Zakłady Autobusowe – owned by the city
  - Depot R-1 „Woronicza”
  - Depot R-2 „Kleszczowa”
  - Depot R-3 „Ostrobramska”
  - Depot R-4 „Stalowa”
  - Depot R-6 „Płochocińska”
- ReloBus(formerly Arriva Bus Transport Polska) – private company
- Mobilis – private company
- KM Łomianki – owned by the city Łomianki
- PKS Grodzisk – private company
- Grodziskie Przewozy Autobusowe (GPA) – private company

=== Lines ===
Routes	Type of service	Notes
100	Seasonal line	
1xx-2xx	Standard lines	
3xx	Seasonal lines	Run on weekdays during rush hour or all day long, except (for some lines) during summer and winter breaks.
4xx	Seasonal rapid transit lines	Run on weekdays during rush hour or all day long, except (for some lines) during summer and winter breaks. As a rule, they stop only at selected stops.
5xx	Rapid transit lines	Run every day, all day long, and stop only at selected stops.
7xx	Zone 1 and 2 lines	
8xx	Rapid transit zone 1 and 2 lines	Run on weekdays during rush hour or all day, except (for some lines) during summer and winter breaks.
9xx	Special lines	

=== Tickets ===
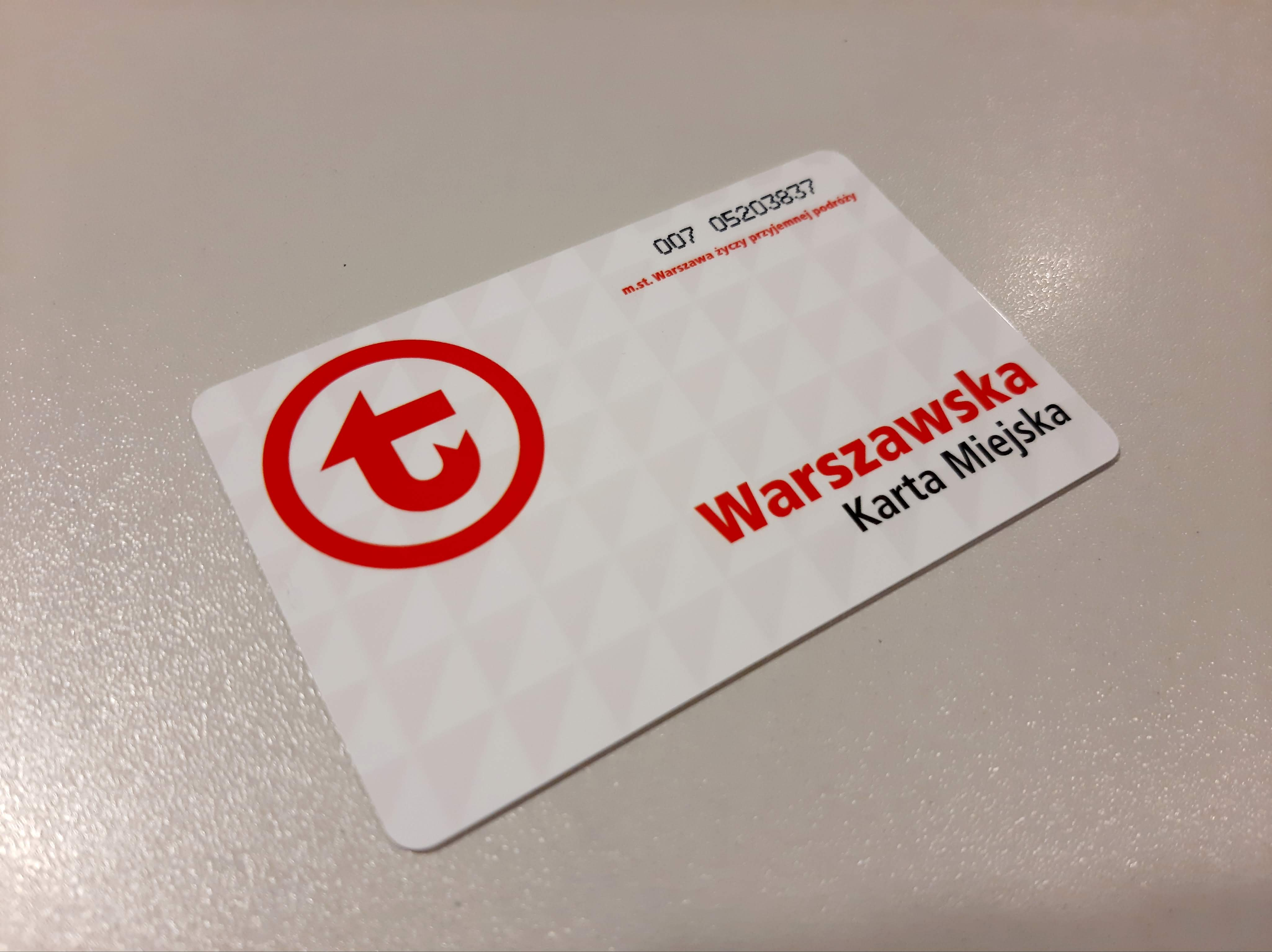
Warszawska Karta Miejska, city travel card

There is one ticket tariff for every mode of transportation. Tickets can be purchased at ticket machines all over the city and online.

== Fleet ==
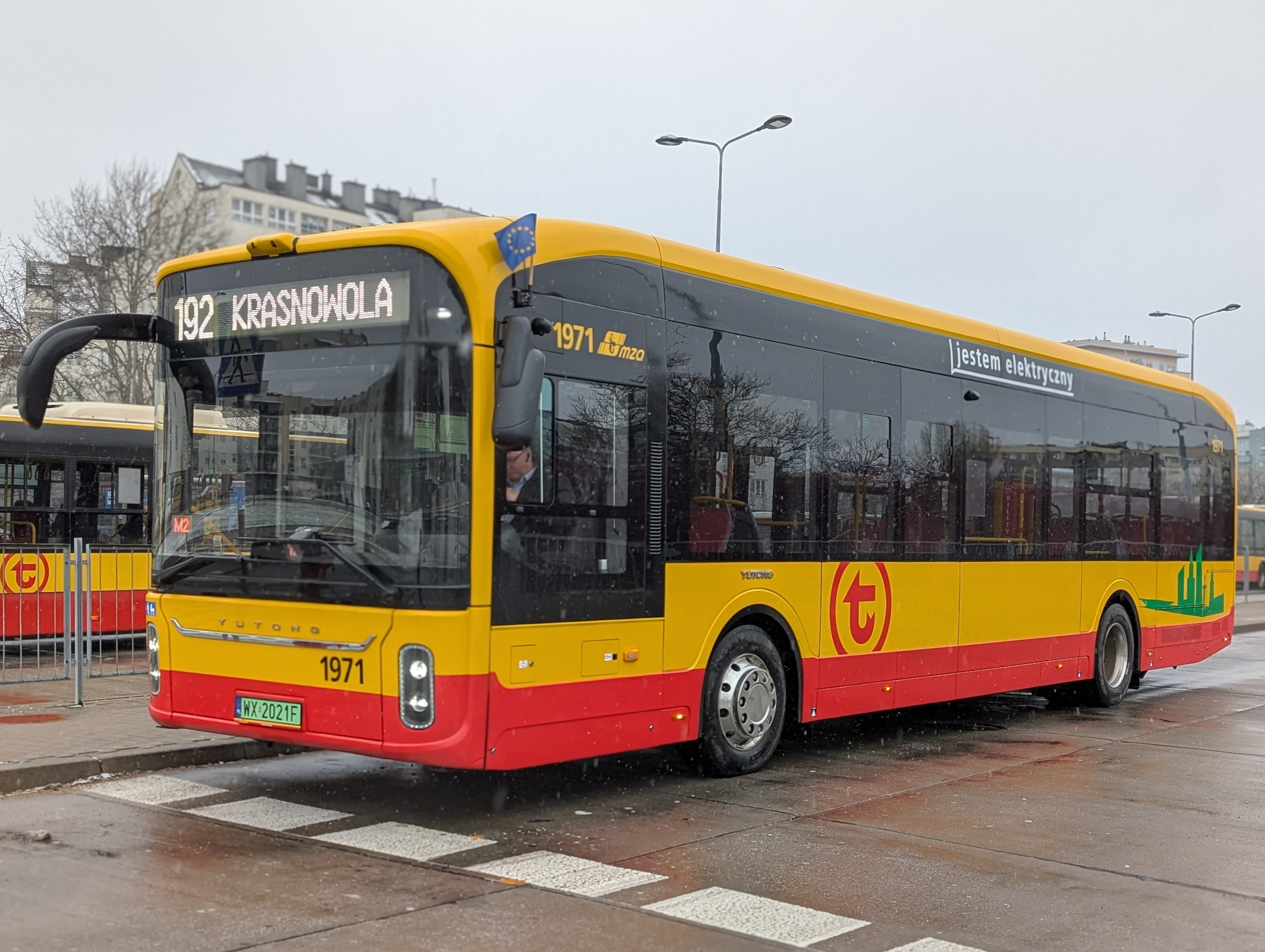
Yutong U12

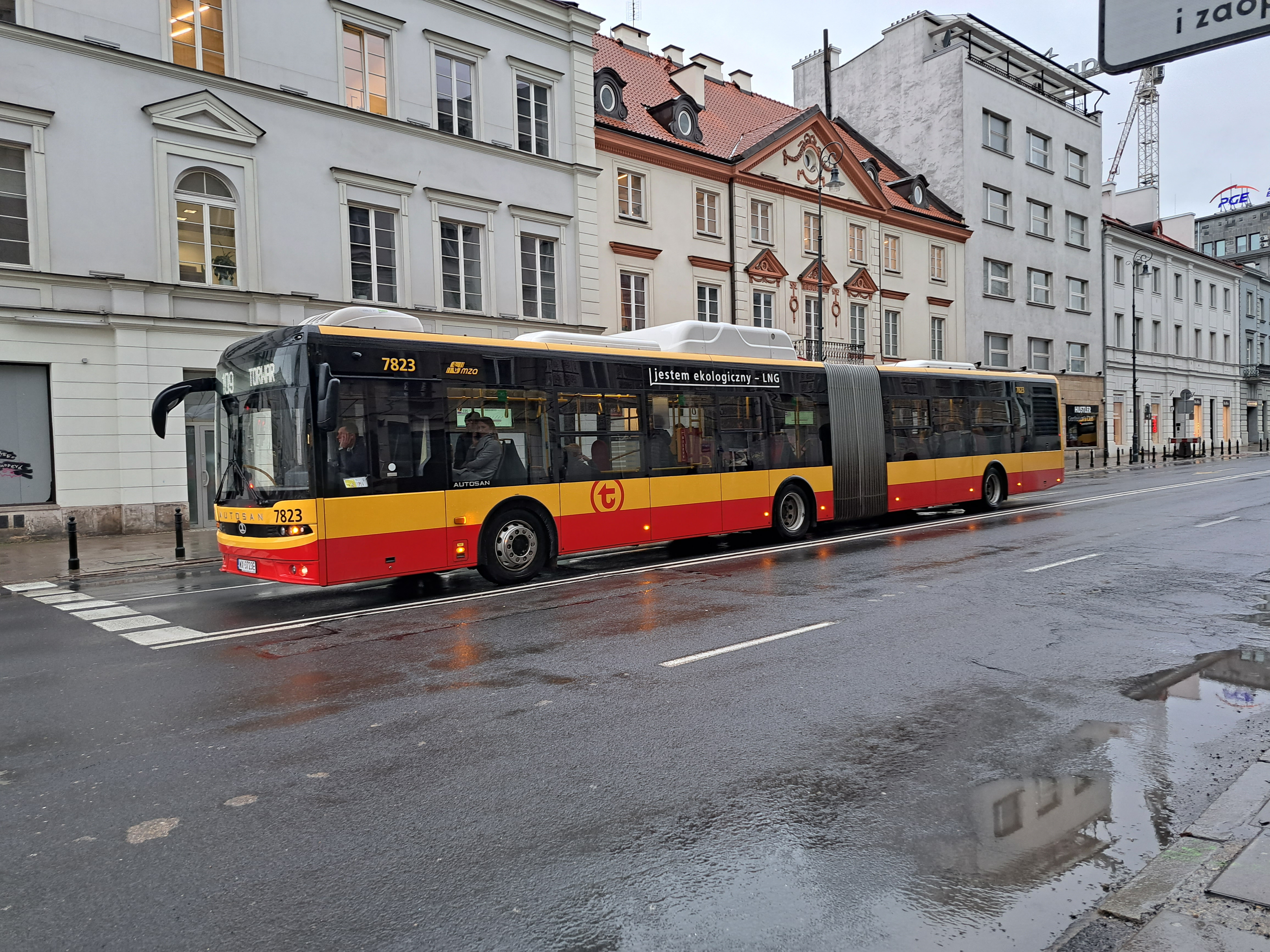
Autosan Sancity 18LF LNG

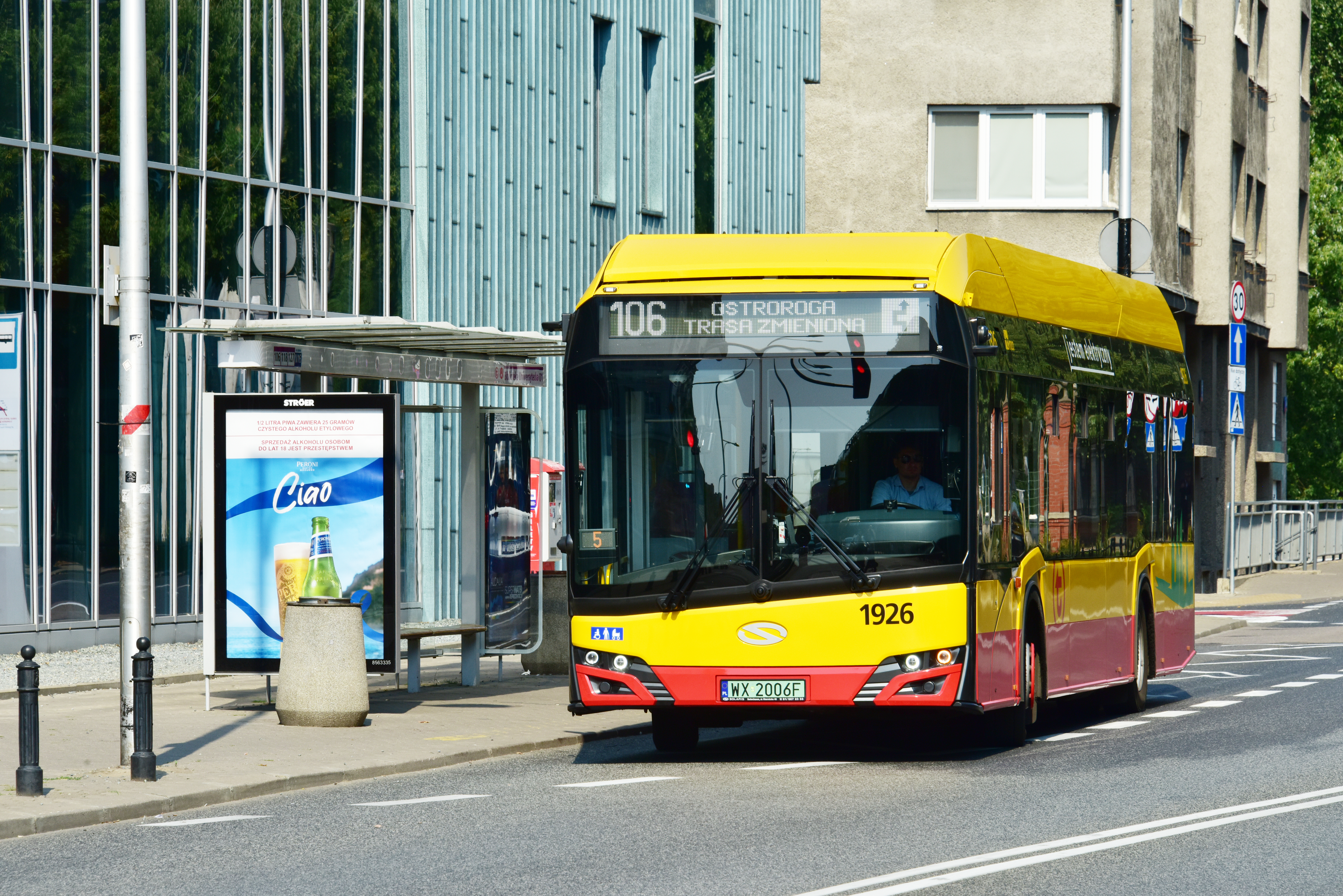
Solaris Urbino 12 electric

The Warsaw bus network comprises 1810 vehicles, including 162 electric ones and 70 hybrid ones.

=== History ===
In November 1994, the first German low-floor Neoplan N4020 was put into operation. 1999 was marked by modern and low-floor Solaris Urbino 15 buses. In 2002, MAN buses joined the Solarises.

=== Current ===
In September 2025, MZA signed a contract with Solaris for electric buses. In January 2026, MZA exercised an option to extend its September 2025 order with Solaris by bringing 79 additional electric buses. The expansion includes 50 articulated Solaris Urbino 18 electric buses and 29 Solaris Urbino 12 electric buses, bringing the total order to a further 158 zero-emission vehicles.

Fleet summary as of 1.06.2025

Model	Miejskie Zakłady Autobusowe					Relobus (Arriva)	KMŁ	Mobilis	PKS Grodzisk	Total
Model	R-1	R-2	R-3	R-4	R-6	Relobus (Arriva)	KMŁ	Mobilis	PKS Grodzisk	Total
MAN NL293 Lion's City B100									5	5
MAN NG 363 Lion's City G				70						70
MAN NG 313 Lion's City G CNG		60								60
MAN NL 313 Lion's City CNG		50								50
MAN Lion's City Hybrid								61		61
Mercedes Conecto G		105						54		159
Mercedes Conecto LF				35						35
Solaris Urbino 10		14	15	6						35
Solaris Urbino 12	10	40	66	34			29		49	228
Solaris Urbino 12 CNG					40					40
Solaris Urbino 12 Electric III and IV	20			12			2			34
Solaris Urbino 18	155	59	41	145			2			402
Solaris Urbino 18 CNG			45		15	54				114
Solaris Urbino 18 Hybrid			4							4
Solaris Urbino 18 Electric	31	1	50	50						132
Solbus SM 10	40									40
Solbus SM 12	25									25
Solbus SM 18		45								45
Solbus SM 18 LNG			35							35
Ursus CS12E	10									10
Ursus CS12LF							2			2
Scania CN280UB Citywide CNG		29								29
Otokar Vectio C						34				34
Autosan Sancity 18LF LNG			91							91
Yutong U12	18									18
Total	309	403	347	352	55	88	35	115	54	1758

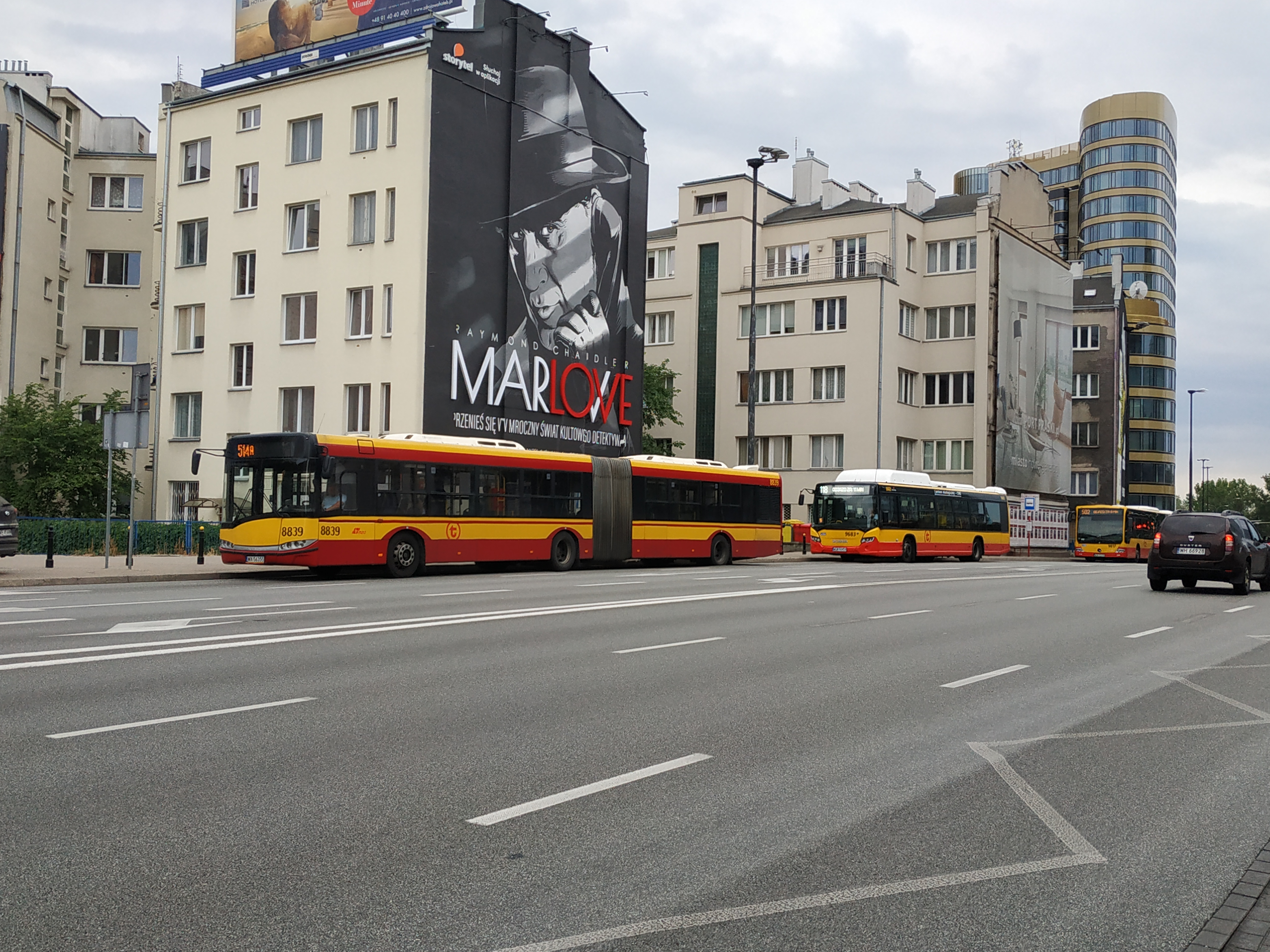
Solaris urbino 18 and Scania CN280UB Citywide CNG
