= E. Wedel =

Polish confectionery company

- Type: Subsidiary
- Industry: Confectionery
- Founded: Warsaw, Poland (1851)
- Founder: Karol Wedel, Emil Wedel
- Headquarters: Warsaw, Poland
- Owner: Lotte
- Number of employees: 1,200 (2020)
- Website: www.wedel.com

E. Wedel (pronunciation: Veh-del) is a Polish confectionery company, which has been producing a variety of chocolates, cakes, and snacks since 1851. Wedel is also a well-recognized brand of candy in Poland, considered to be the "Polish national chocolate brand" in that market, and is the leading candy brand among Polish producers, with about 14% of the Polish market in 2005, and 11.7% in 2007.

In June 2010, Kraft Foods Inc sold Wedel to Lotte Group, a South Korean-Japanese conglomerate, as part of their enforced divestment program of certain parts of the Cadbury plc, which it had acquired in March 2010.

== History ==
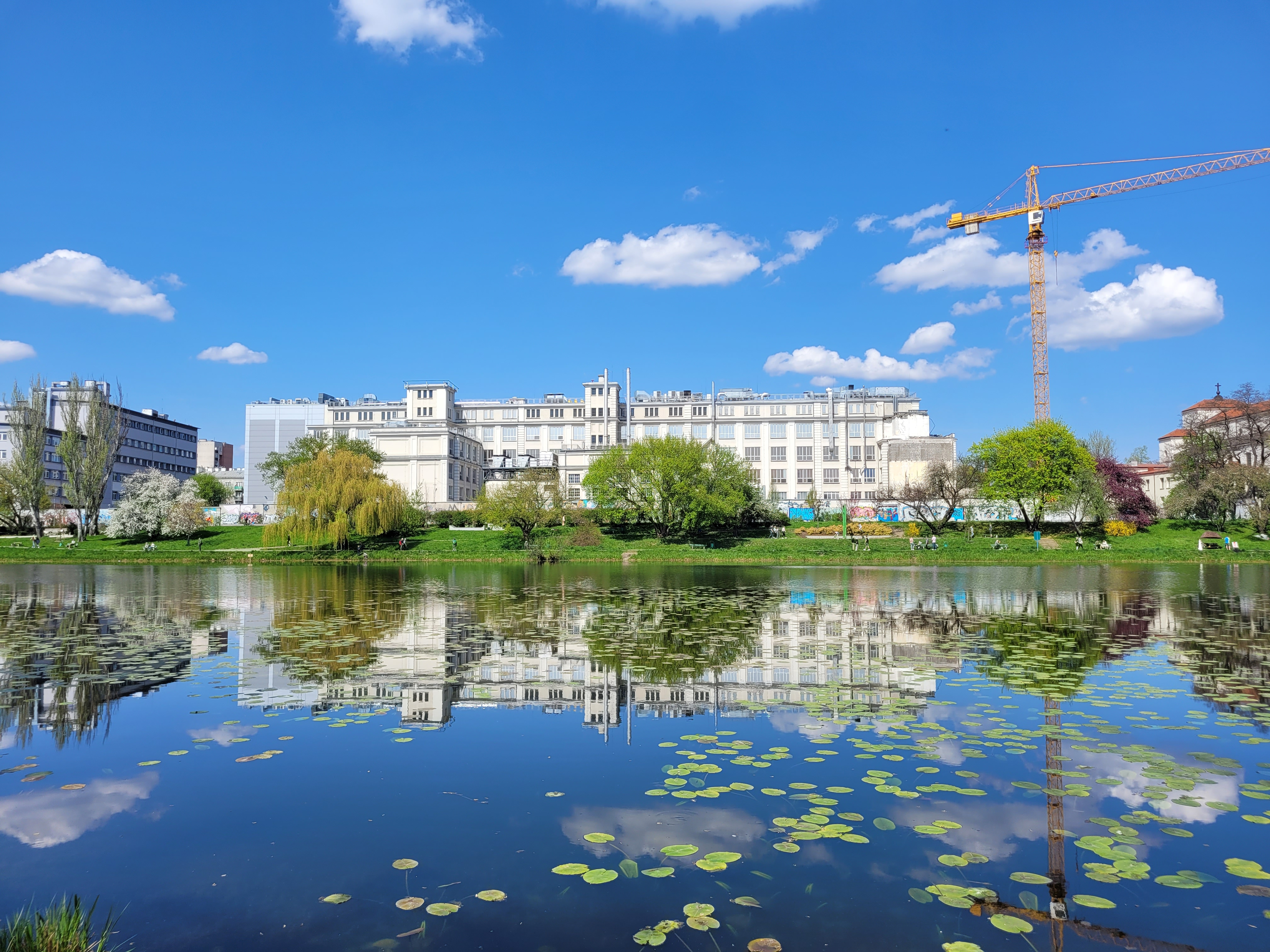
Wedel factory in Warsaw's Praga South district viewed from Kamionowski Lake.

Founded in 1851 by Karl Ernst (Karol Ernest) Wedel (1813–1902), the company and its products became known in most of Central and Eastern Europe. The logo of the company is based on Emil Wedel's signature. His son Emil Albert Fryderyk Wedel (1841–1919) apprenticed in candy and chocolate factories in Western Europe before inheriting and expanding his father's business. His descendant Jan Wedel (d. 1960), the last member of the Wedel family to own the company, was considered "the Willy Wonka" of pre-war Poland. In 1894 the company moved its main factory to Szpitalna street in Warsaw. In 1930, during the time of the Great Depression, Jan Wedel opened a second factory in Praga, one of the most modern in the Second Polish Republic. The company was also known for its very generous social welfare policies. As one of the first in Europe, it had its own crèche, kindergarten, hospital and cafeteria, and rewarded its best employees with interest-free housing loans; its model was highly acclaimed by the Polish Socialist Party. Hence prior to World War II, Wedel became a successful private company, with shops in London and Paris.

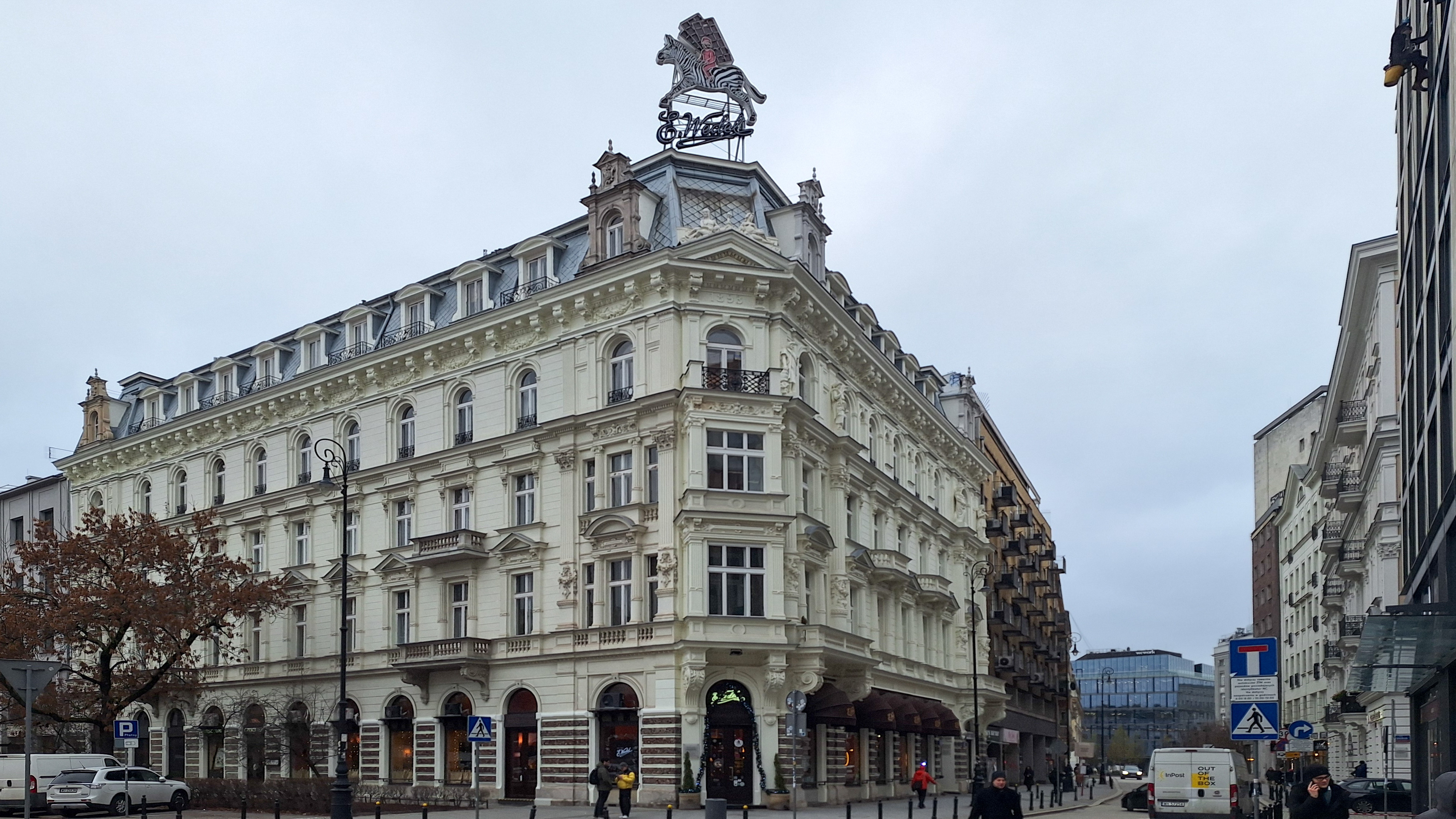
Wedel's Residence on Szpitalna Street, one of the few preserved apartment houses from the end of the 19th century.

Jan Wedel made plans for World War II, and the company managed to continue production during the first few years of the war; it also started producing basic foodstuffs such as bread for starving Warsaw, and was the site of the underground teaching. Despite the family's German ancestry Wedel refused to collaborate with the Germans, and did not sign the Volksliste; increasingly this led to him and his employees being persecuted by the Nazis. The war devastated Poland and the company; the buildings at Warsaw were destroyed during the Warsaw Uprising. After the war, Wedel rebuilt the factory, only to have the communist government nationalize the company. The Wedel plant itself was renamed '22 Lipca' (22 July) after the Communist 'Independence Day' (PKWN Manifesto), although even the communists chose to retain the Wedel brand name, with products bearing both the new and old logos (particularly as after 10 years of not using the logo, all attempts at exporting proved futile). The company was reprivatized in 1989 after the fall of communism in Poland. In 1991 it was bought by PepsiCo Foods and Beverages, at which time sales were about $50–$60 million. In 1995 sales exceeded $200 million. About 10% of the products are exported, primarily to the United Kingdom, United States and Canada. The Warsaw facility employed 1,100 workers in 1998.

== Cadbury-Wedel Polska ==
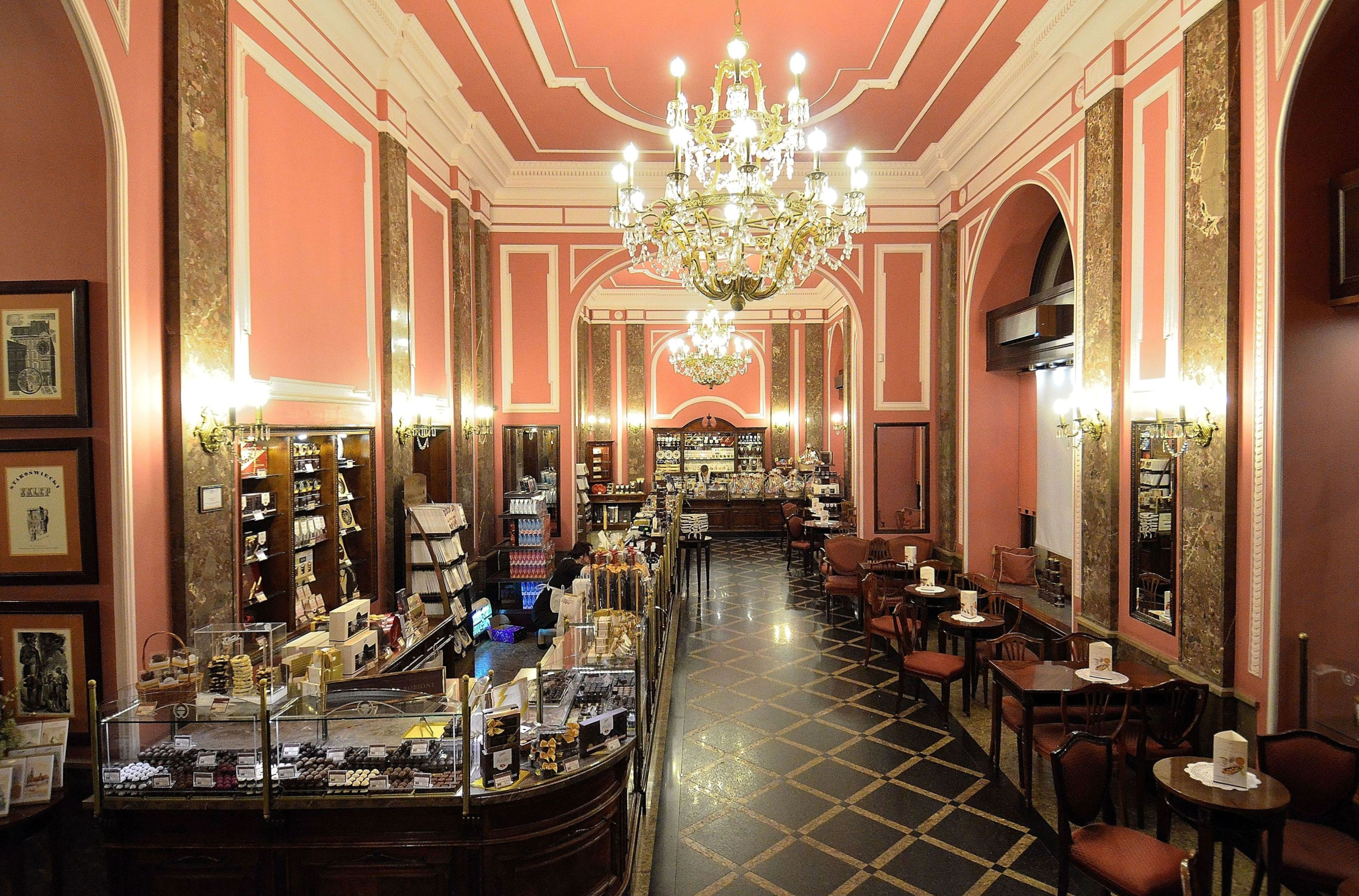
The original E.Wedel shop at 8 Szpitalna Street in Warsaw.

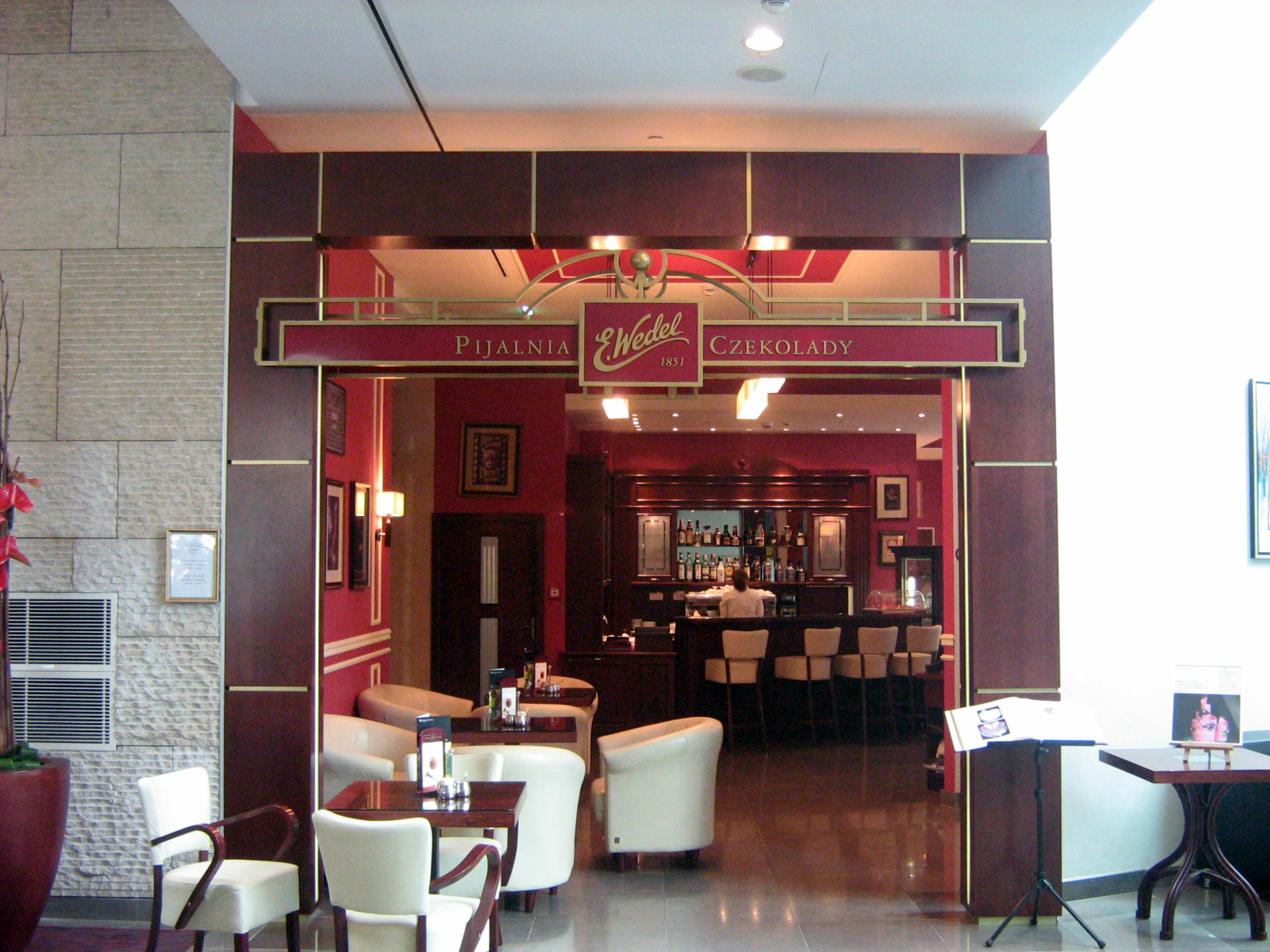
Wedel chocolate fountain and cafe at InterContinental hotel.

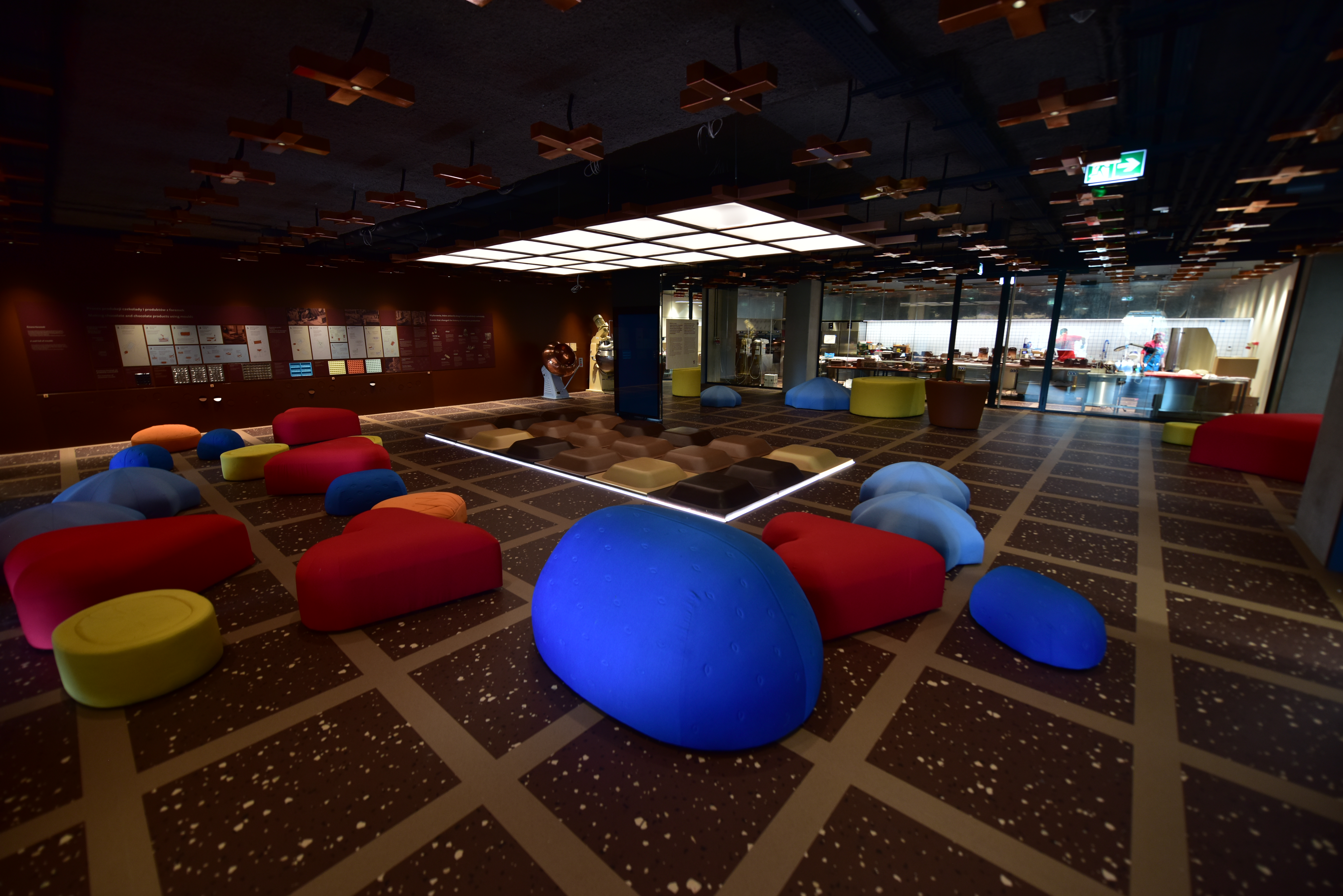
E. Wedel Chocolate Factory Museum opened in 2024.

Cadbury Schweppes made its initial investment in Poland in 1993, constructing a chocolate plant for its own products in Bielany Wrocławskie.

In 1999, Cadbury bought E. Wedel and the factory in Praga, from PepsiCo for US$76.5 million. The Praga factory was modernised in 2007, with investment in both new laboratories and office space, as well as a new production line for the brand's flagship product Ptasie Mleczko, a chocolate candy with a marshmallow like centre.

In 2007, as part of the Wałbrzych Special Economic Zone, Cadbury-Wedel Polska started building a £100m chewing gum plant in Skarbimierz-Osiedle. It presently produces brands such as Trident, Stimorol, V6, and Hollywood. The company also acquired rights to an additional 60 acres (0.24 km^{2}) plot which in 2009 it started to develop as a new chocolate facility, which would take over production of brands previously made at the Somerdale Factory in Keynsham, Bristol from 2011. In 2008, Cadbury received the accolade of “Most Significant Investor in Poland” from the Polish Information and Foreign Investment Agency.

In recent years, the company has also branched out, opening a series of chocolate shops based on pre-war tradition.

== Lotte ownership ==
In March 2010 Kraft Foods Inc acquired Cadbury plc. The European Commission insisted that Wedel be sold in order for the takeover to go ahead as a combined Kraft/Cadbury-Wedel would have too large a share of the Polish confectionery market. To satisfy this demand Wedel was sold to Lotte of South Korea in June 2010. This was Lotte's first investment in Europe although they are the 3rd largest chewing gum maker in the world and a large player in the Asian confectionery market. Kraft Foods have kept the rights to the Cadbury, Halls, and other brands along with two plants manufacturing Cadbury products in Skarbimierz-Osiedle.

== Popular products ==
- Ptasie mleczko – Chocolate covered marshmallows.
- Mieszanka Wedlowska – Assorted chocolate covered candy with a variety of fillings.
- Torcik Wedlowski – A large, circular, chocolate covered wafer with hand-made decorations.
- Pawełek – A chocolate bar with a flavored filling that contains a small amount of alcohol.
- Krówka – Individually wrapped milky cream fudge candy.
- Delicje Szampańskie – Circular cookies with sponge base and a jam centre, covered with chocolate (also known as Jaffa cakes).

== See also ==
- Economy of Poland
- List of Polish companies
