= Robert Zydel =

Polish ethnographer and market researcher

Director of the E. Wedel Chocolate Factory Museum
- Incumbent
- Assumed office 2023

Personal details
- Born: 1976 (age 49–50)
- Education: Institute of Ethnology and Cultural Anthropology University of Warsaw

Robert Zydel (born 1976 in Warsaw) is a Polish ethnographer, market researcher, and cultural and advertising manager. He was Director National Museum of Ethnography in Warsaw from 2021 to 2023 and the originator of the Vistula Ethnographic Expedition. He introduced a new visiting policy at the museum, also opening it to animals. He has been Director of the E. Wedel Chocolate Factory Museum in Warsaw since 2024.

From 2014 to 2020 he worked at the City of Warsaw, where he headed the City Marketing Office. He was responsible, among other things, for campaigns encouraging people to pay personal income tax in Warsaw, as well as coordinating the Night of Museums. He served as a juror in the Effie Awards marketing effectiveness competition, including in 2016, 2020 and 2023. He was also a member of the board of the Polish Society of Market and Opinion Researchers from 2020 to 2022. He was a member of the Museum Council at the Adam Mickiewicz Museum of Literature in Warsaw from 2021 to 2024.

Zydel is the author of books and articles:

- Malarz nad malarzami : Nikifor w kolekcji Państwowego Muzeum Etnograficznego w Warszawie (2022)
- Bojarska K., Kącka E., Zydel R., Szerszeń T., Przeciwko ostrości widzenia. O „Wszystkich wojnach świata” Tomasza Szerszenia, Konteksty. Polska Sztuka Ludowa, 2021/4, s. 184
- P. Cichocki, T. Jędrkiewicz, R. Zydel, Etnografia wirtualna, [w:] Badania jakościowe. Metody i narzędzia. Tom 2, red. D. Jemielniak, Warszawa 2012, s. 203–222.

== Awards ==
In 2020, Robert Zydel was awarded the Gold Cross of Merit for promoting the commemoration of the Warsaw Uprising.
