= United Confectioners =

Russian confectionery holding

- Company type: Private company
- Industry: Confectionery
- Founded: 2000; 25 years ago
- Headquarters: Moscow, Russia
- Area served: Russia
- Products: chocolate bars, cakes, cookies and candies
- Revenue: $1.12 billion (2017)
- Net income: $19.4 million (2016)
- Total equity: $40.9 million (2016)
- Owner: GUTA Group
- Number of employees: 17,000 (2013)
- Website: eng.uniconf.ru

United Confectioners (Russian: Объединённые кондитеры, romanized: Obedinyonnye konditery) is a Russian confectionery holding. Through its subsidiaries it produces chocolate bars, cakes, cookies and candies. The holding owns brands such as Krasny Oktyabr, Rot Front and Babayevsky. The company employed 17,000 people in 2013.

As of 2015 it was the 13th largest confectionery company worldwide, with sales of $2.2 billion. Until 2011 the company was partly owned by the city of Moscow, and it is currently part of the GUTA Group. In 2016 the company had a 20% share of the Russian confectionery market. In 2014 the company's products were removed from retail in Ukraine, in retaliation against similar actions taken against the Ukrainian confectioner Roshen.

== History ==
The company was founded in the early 2000s.

Until 2014 26.6% of the shares belonged to the Government of Moscow (the share was sold for 7 billion rubles).

== Performance indicator ==
The group's share of sales in the Russian confectionery market in 2009 was 14%, in 2017 — 21.3%.

In 2010, revenue, according to its own data, amounted to $1.3 billion. In 2006, sales amounted to 20.6 billion rubles. (14.5% more than in 2005).

Revenue in 2020 amounted to 63.7 billion rubles, the company entered the Forbes magazine rating "200 largest private companies in Russia 2021" in 166th place.
