= Torcik Wedlowski =

Polish wafer cake covered in chocolate

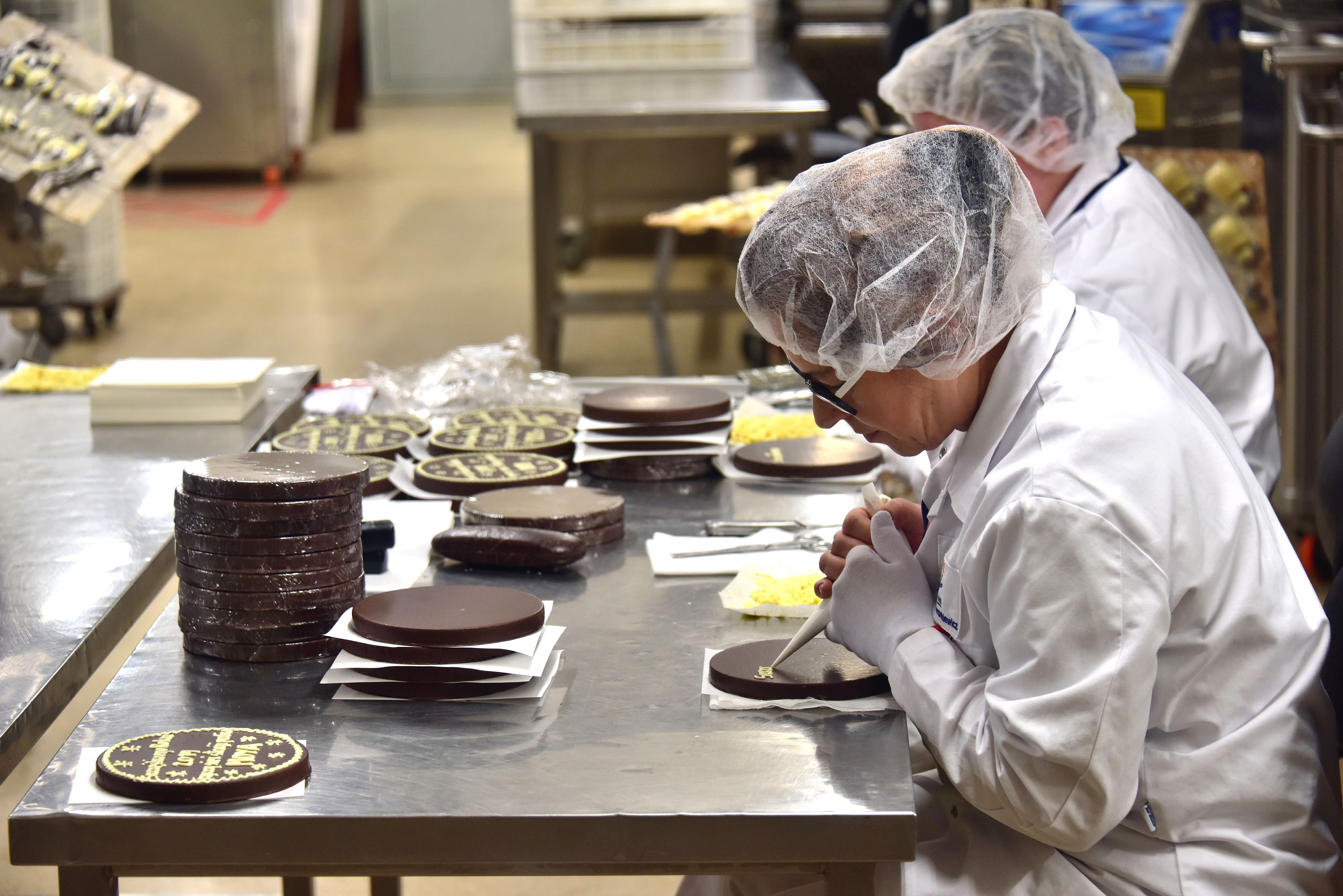
- Hand-decorating Wedel cakes at the Lotte Wedel factory in Warsaw
- Alternative names: Wedel Wafer Cake
- Place of origin: Poland
- Created by: Jan Wedel (attributed)
- Main ingredients: Wafer, chocolate, nut mass

Torcik Wedlowski is a confectionery product of the E. Wedel brand in the form of a wafer cake, layered with nut butter and covered with chocolate. Each cake is decorated by one of the 24 employees of the Lotte Wedel factory's "Rarities Department". It was introduced to the market in the interwar period. The author is unknown; its creation is likely attributed to Jan Wedel, who was inspired by 19th-century recipes. This product is a registered trademark of Lotte Wedel.

== Manufacturing process ==
The Torcik Wedlowski production line is one of the oldest in the Lotte Wedel factory. After baking, the wafers are layered with nut filling and pressed, then machine-cut into a distinctive circular shape. The cut edges are crushed and used in the production of "Bajeczny" candies and bars. The tortes are then dipped in chocolate and sent to the hand-decorated department. This department employs only women, each decorating 430 tortes a day. A special online tool allows customers to order a torte with custom decoration. The classic version weighs 250 grams; other versions weighing 235, 500, and 750 grams are also available. Each torte is packaged in a cardboard box; per 2025, the Torcik Wedlowski is also available in a round box modeled after the 1936 packaging.

== Selected awards and distinctions ==
- 2015: Silver award in the food products category for Torcik Wedlowski 250 g (round historical Torcik), received by Pijalnia Czekolady E.Wedel at the Monde Selection competition.
- 2004, 2006, 2007, 2008, 2009: Superbrands award for the Torcik Wedlowski product
- 1970: Torcik Wedlowski won a gold medal at the quality competition held on the occasion of the Conference of Confectionery Industries of Socialist Countries
