= Rot Front (confectionery brand) =

Russian confectionery manufacturer

Rot Front OJSC
- Type: Public
- Industry: Confectionery
- Founded: 1826
- Headquarters: Moscow, Russia
- Key people: Viktor Palatov (Chief Executive)
- Products: Candies, chocolate, caramel, wafers, dragee
- Number of employees: over 2,500
- Website: http://www.rotfront.ru

Rot Front Open Joint-Stock Company (Russian: Открытое акционерное общество "Рот Фронт", ОАО "Рот Фронт") is one of the oldest Russian confectionery manufacturers and a member of United Confectioners holding company. Rot Front produces over 200 types of confectionery and sells in all Russian regions, CIS countries, Western Europe, North America and the Middle East.

== Early history ==
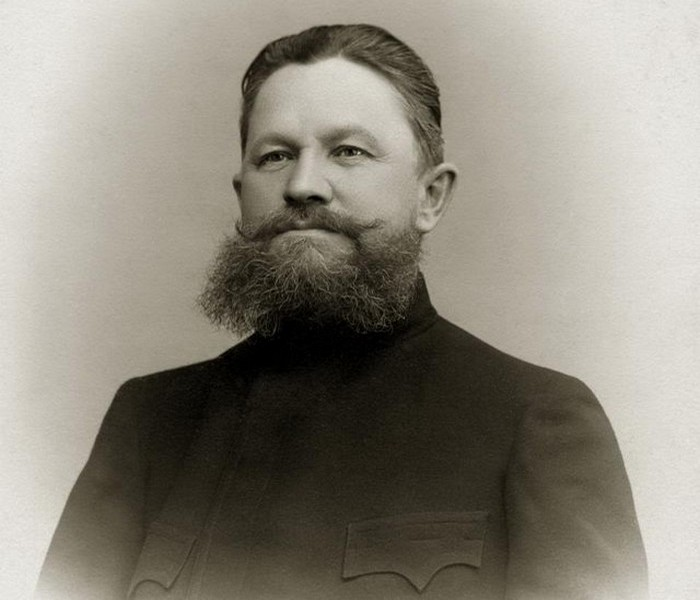
Georgy Lenov

Founded in 1826 by the Lenov merchants as a home family confectionery workshop for the production of caramel, the workshop was located in the area of old Moscow - in Zamoskvorechye, on Malaya Bolvanovka street (2nd Novokuznetskiy lane) next to the Church of the Savior on Bolvany. The main products of the first years were lollipops, with the workshop processing 80 kilograms of sugar a day. Lollipops were sold at festivities, fairs and auctions. Gradually, the production of confectionery products increased. In 1830, Antip Lenov opened his own confectionery.

In 1886, the workshop passed to Lenov's grandson - Georgy (1853-1912) and his wife Catherine Sergeevna Lenova. Since that time, the family gradually bought up confectionery establishments around them and by 1895, employed 69 people.

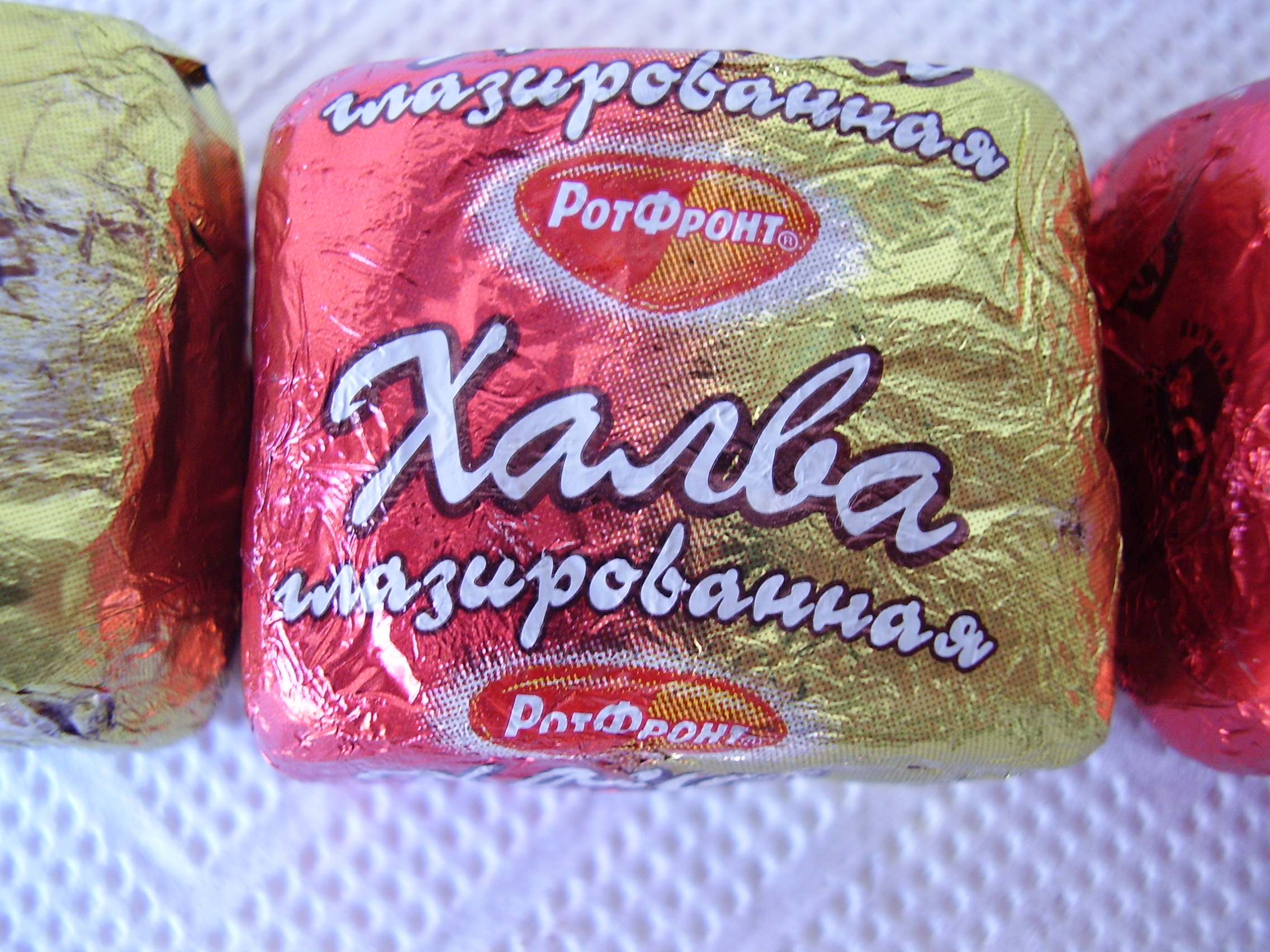
Rot Front's Halva, made from peanuts

In 1897, Georgy Lenov entered the merchant class, becoming a merchant of the 2nd guild. In 1900, the workshop received the name "Trading House of G. and E. Lenova", and registered its own trademark. The trademark showed two graceful fruit trees with intertwined crowns, and below, between the roots, were placed letters - the initials of the owners: G., E., L. (Georgy and Ekaterina Lenov); the image of the brand name was placed on various types of packaging: on labels, on boxes, on tin cans, and even just on bags for selling loose confectionery products. Soon the Lenovs opened their first own establishment.

Their son Nikolai (1885-1952) and his wife Nadezhda (1883-1963) also took part in management. The merchants fled the country before the revolution, and in November 1918, by decree of the Sovnarkoma, the factory was nationalized.

== After 1918 ==
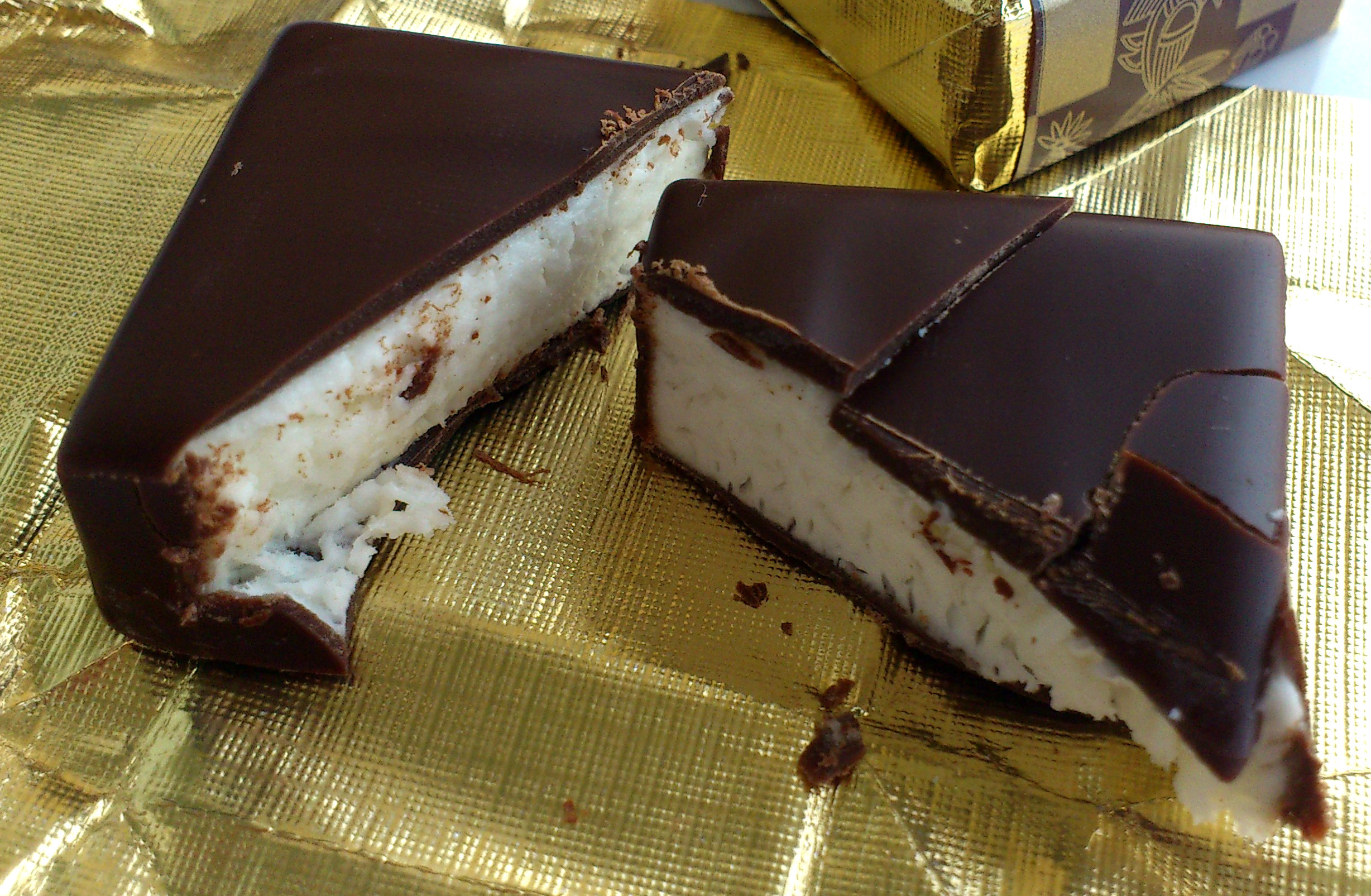
The confectionery "Птичье молоко," or "Bird's Milk," produced by Rot Front

The company acquired its present name from Roter Frontkämpferbund, after their Communist slogan Rot Front!, during the 1931 delegation visit by Ernst Thälmann.

In 1971, it was merged with the Moscow Marat Confectionery Factory (until 1920 known as the "Steam Factory of Chocolate, Cocoa, Coffee and Sweets of the A. and S. Ivanovs Trading House"). In 1976, Rot Front was awarded the Order of Lenin. In 1980, it became the second, (after the Estonian factory Kalev), Soviet enterprise to successfully produce chewing gum.

In 1992, Rot Front was privatized, and in 2002 it became a part of United Confectioners.

Today the company produces close to 25,000 tons of sweets a year and employs over 3,000 people.

As of June 15, 2024 the organization is in the process of reorganization.

== Income ==
The amount of the authorized capital of the Open Joint Stock Company "ROT FRONT" is 151 556 106.00 rubles.

In 2023 the company's profit is — 731 690 000 rubles, the revenue in 2023— 21 623 042 000 rubles.
