= Karol Wedel =

German confectioner

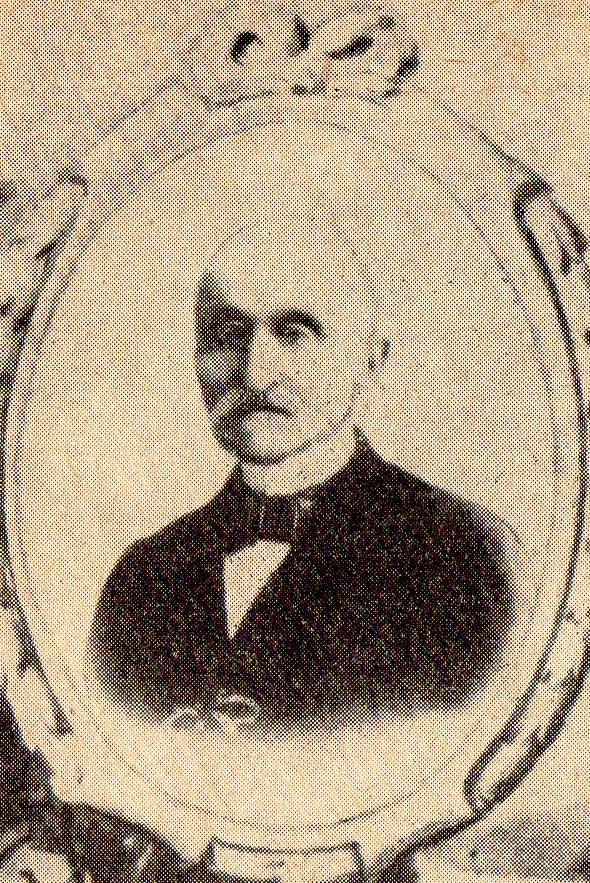
Karol Wedel

Karl Ernst Wedel (February 7, 1813 – June 17, 1902) was a German confectioner of the Wedel family, who settled in Warsaw.

== Early life ==
He was a member of the Evangelical-Augsburg Church in Poland.

Wedel came to Warsaw at the beginning of 1845 and began to work with Karl Grohnert, who was an owner of a confectionery store at 12 Piwna Street. The collaboration between them was a success and won them a large group of loyal customers.

Soon afterwards, around 1851, Wedel became financially independent and opened his own store at 12 Miodowa Street, and next door, a steam-powered factory making chocolate. His company, E.Wedel would grow into one of the leading confectionery companies in Poland. A year later, he introduced his widely popular "karmelki smietankowe" ("cream caramels"); the caramels' success was aided by an advertising campaign in "Kurier Warszawski" daily newspaper.

Another product made popular by Wedel was drinking chocolate. The store was selling over five hundred cups a day. As the years passed, more products, under the brands, "Brilliant" and "Dessert", were introduced.

Wedel married Karolina Wisnowska (1819-1893), daughter of another famous Warsaw confectioner. In 1864, Wedel's son, Emil Albert Friedrich Wedel (1841-1919) returned from an apprenticeship tour of confectioneries in Germany, Switzerland, England, and France, and received a Ph.D. in chemistry (in particular food chemistry). On his return he joined the family business. In 1876, his father gave him the company as a wedding gift on the day of his marriage.
