= Solbus =

Polish bus manufacturer

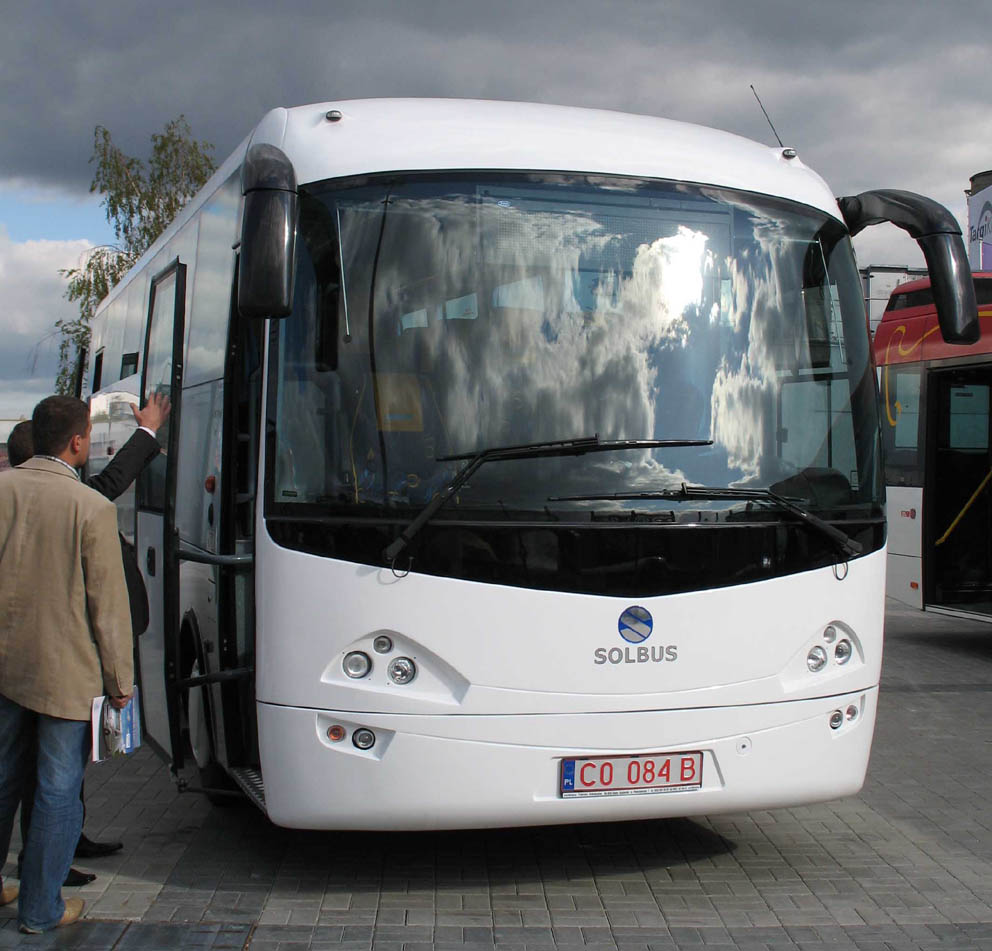
Solbus Soltour ST11 in Kielce, Poland

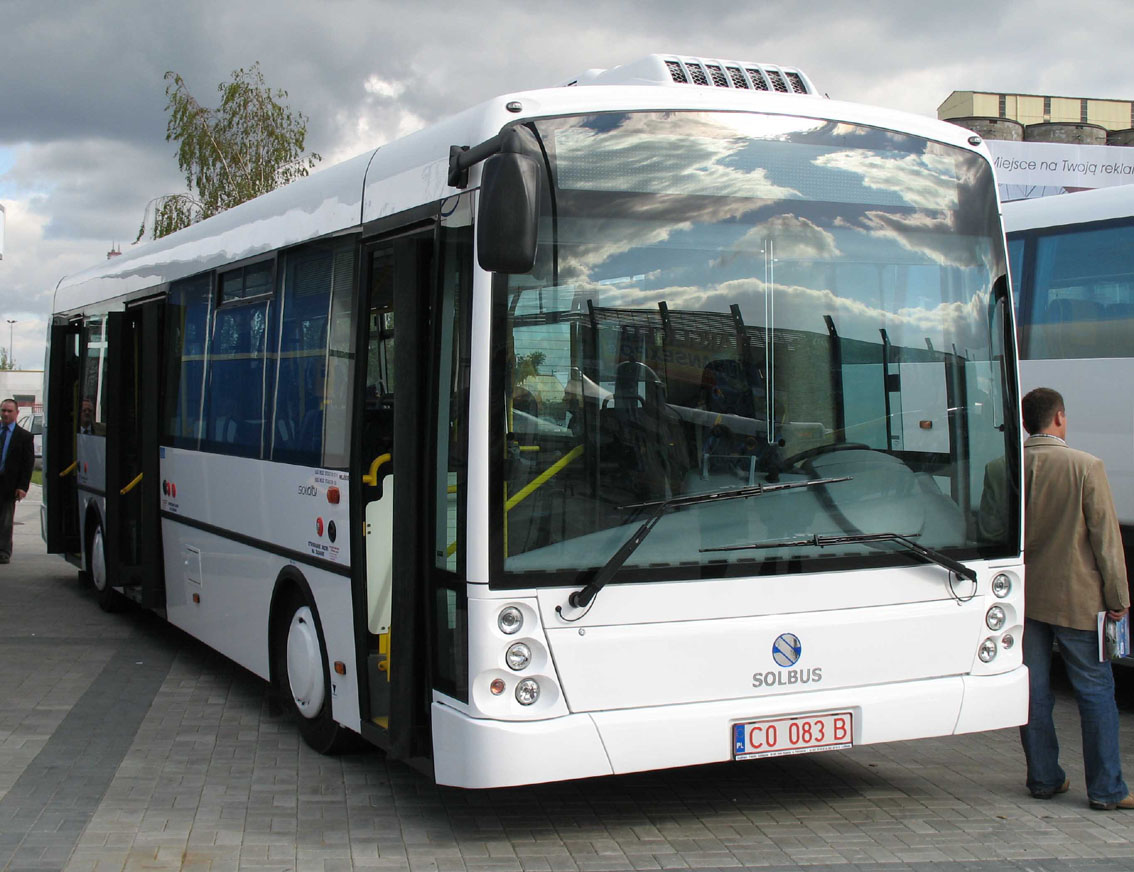
Solbus Solcity SN11M in Kielce, Poland

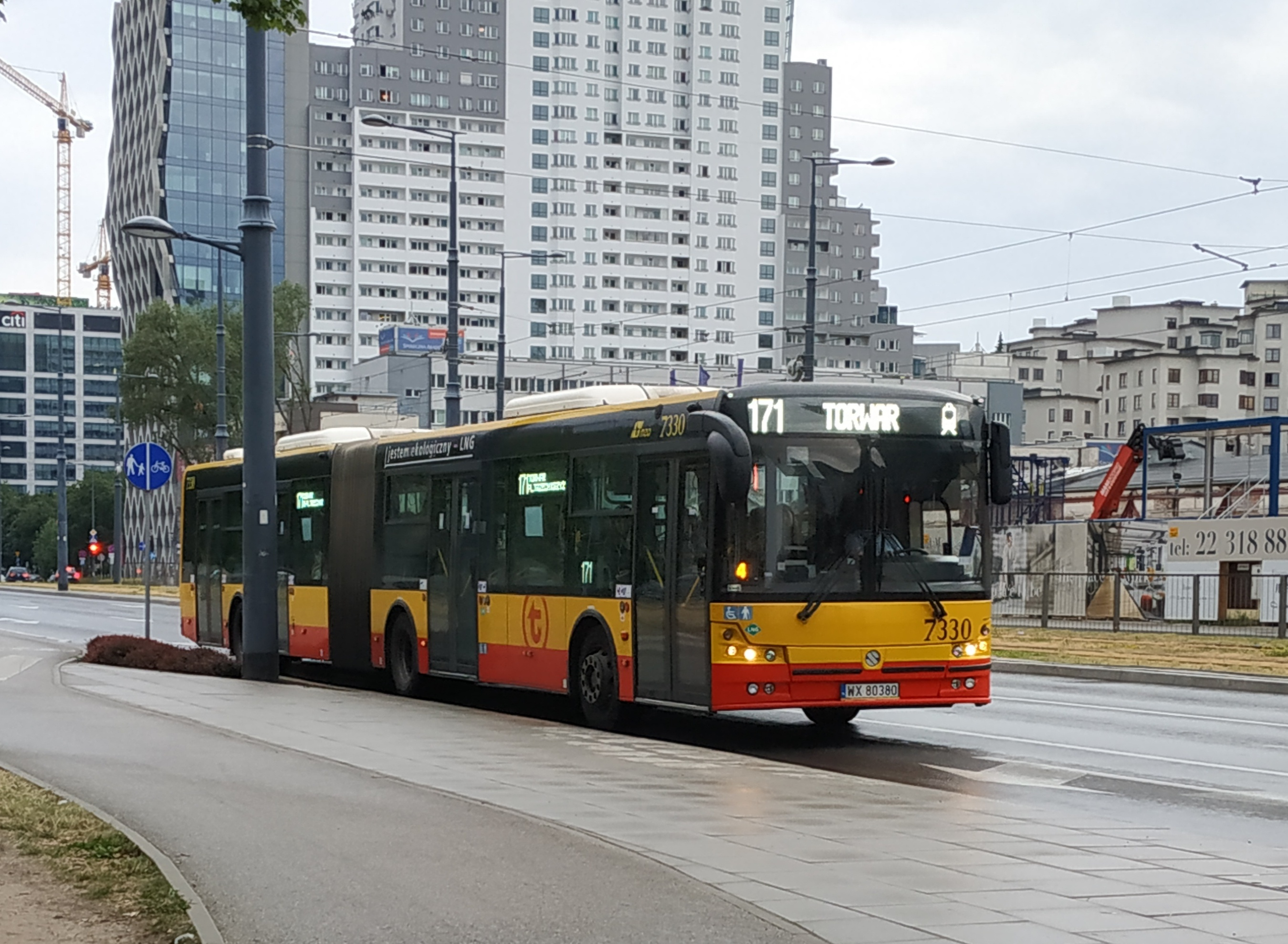
LNG gas powered city bus Solbus Solcity SM18 LNG

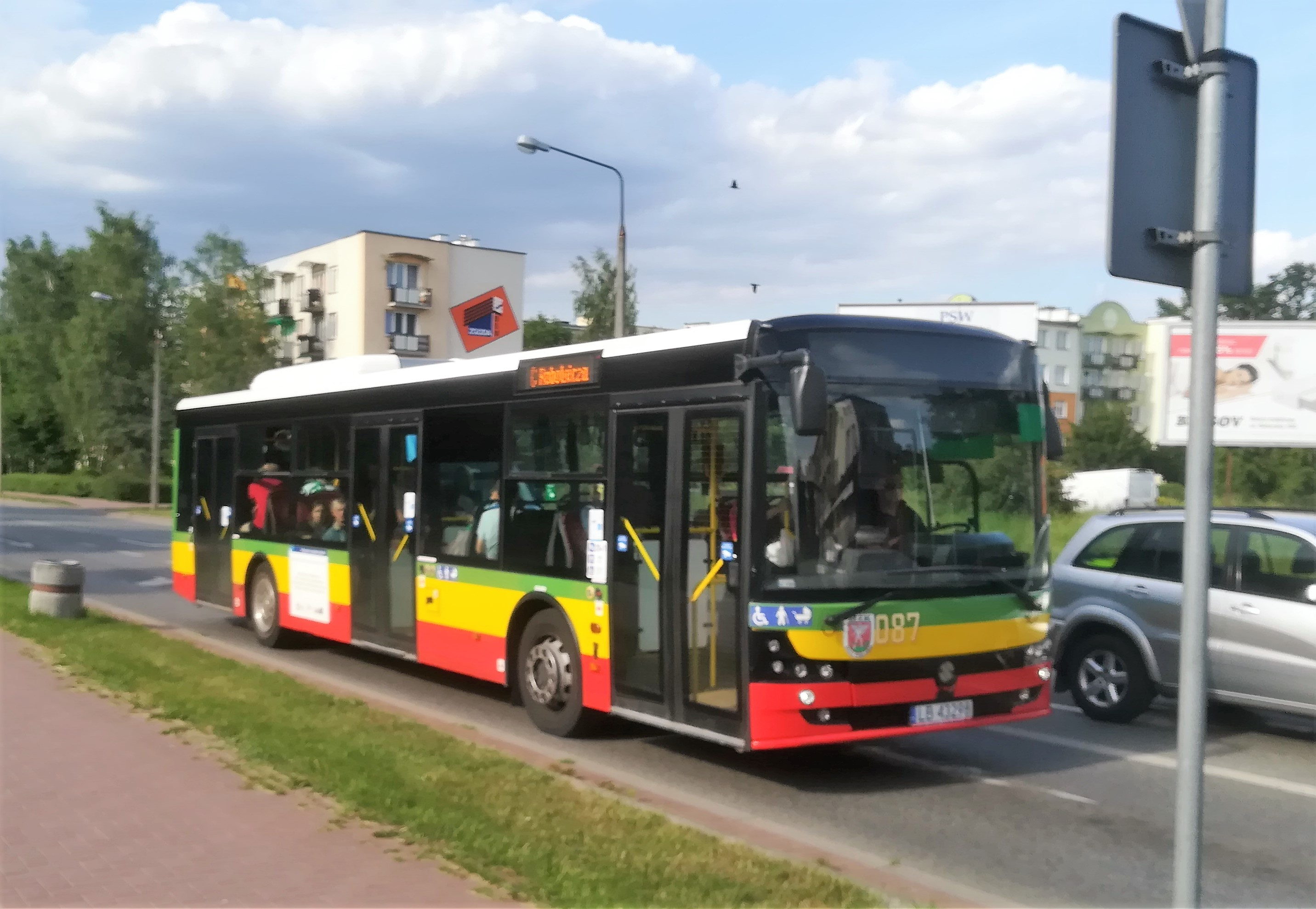
Solbus Solcity SM12 in Biała Podlaska, Poland

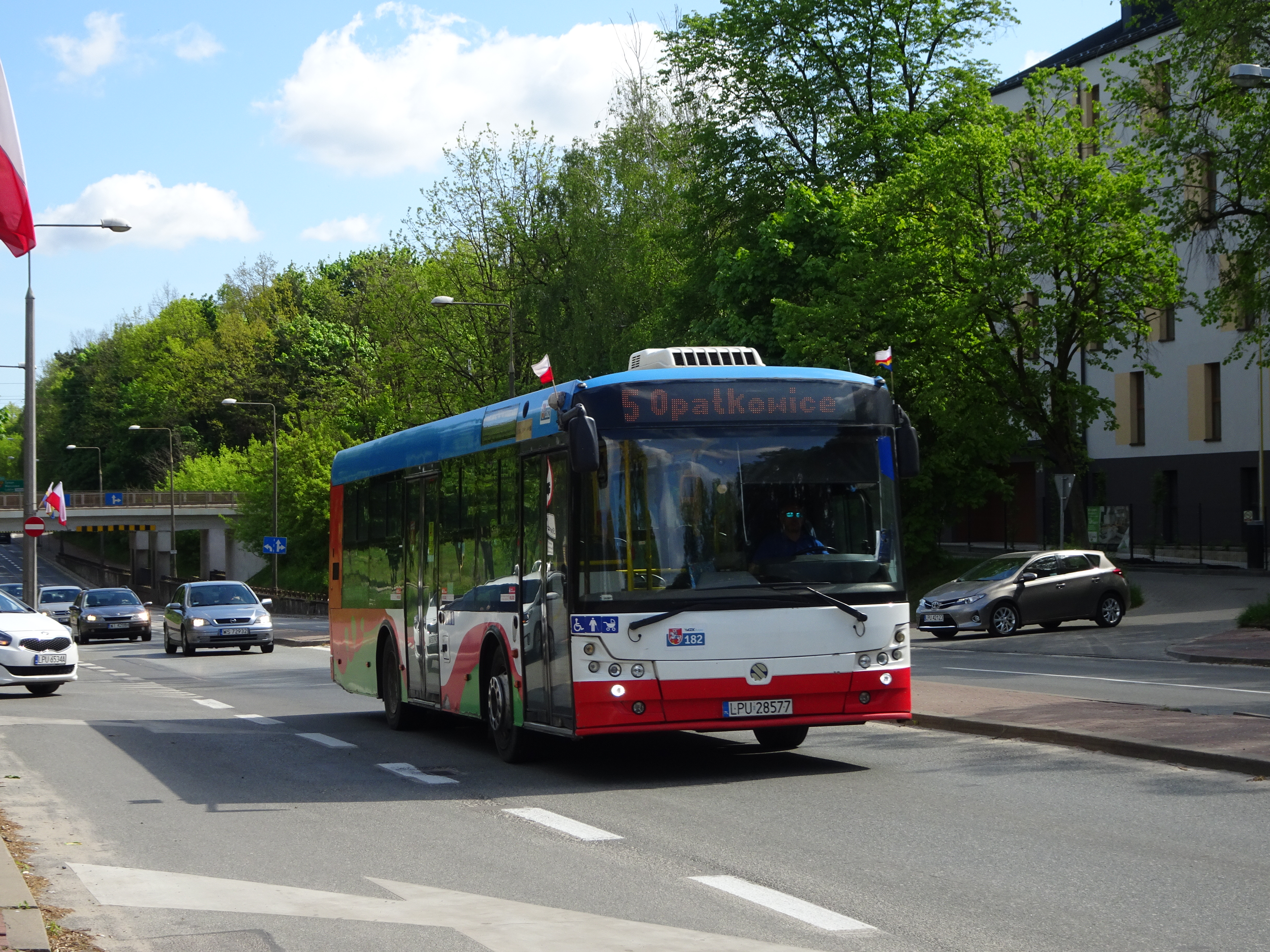
Solbus Solcity SM10 in Puławy, Poland

Solbus is a Polish bus manufacturer founded in 2001 in Solec Kujawski. It has been described as one of the "major players in Poland's automotive industry". In 2005 it accounted for 20% of bus production in Poland, and was named by the business daily Puls Biznesu as the best company and one of the three fastest growing companies in the Kuyavian-Pomeranian Voivodeship. Currently it produces approximately 100-150 buses a year.

== Products - buses ==
Actual offer:

- Tourist coaches
  - Solbus Soltour ST10
  - Solbus Soltour ST11
- Intercity buses
  - Solbus Soltour ST10/I
  - Solbus Soltour ST11/I
  - Solbus Solway SL10
  - Solbus Solway SL11
- Local buses
  - Solbus Solcity SN11L
- City buses
  - Solbus Solcity SN11M
  - Solbus Solcity SM12
  - Solbus Solcity SM12 CNG
  - Solbus Solcity SM12 LNG
  - Solbus Solcity SM18 - new
  - Solbus Solcity SM18 LNG - new

Historical buses:

- Tourist coaches
  - Solbus LH 9,5
  - Solbus C 10,5/1
- Intercity buses
  - Solbus C 9,5
  - Solbus C 10,5
- City buses
  - Solbus B 9,5
