= Krasny Oktyabr (confectionery brand) =

Russian confectionery brand

- Native name: Красный Октябрь
- Company type: Open joint-stock company
- Traded as: MCX: KROT
- Industry: Confectionery
- Founded: 1851
- Headquarters: Moscow, Russia
- Revenue: $243 million (2017)
- Operating income: $20.3 million (2017)
- Net income: $17.7 million (2017)
- Total assets: $22 million (2017)
- Total equity: $157 million (2017)
- Parent: United Confectioners Ltd.
- Website: www.uniconf.ru/factories/krasny-octyabr

OJSC Krasny Oktyabr (Russian: ОАО "Красный Октябрь", "Red October") is a Russian confectionery manufacturer and a member of the United Confectioners holding company. Its parent company was 17th in the list of the largest candy companies in the world, with sales amounting to $1.196 billion.

== History ==
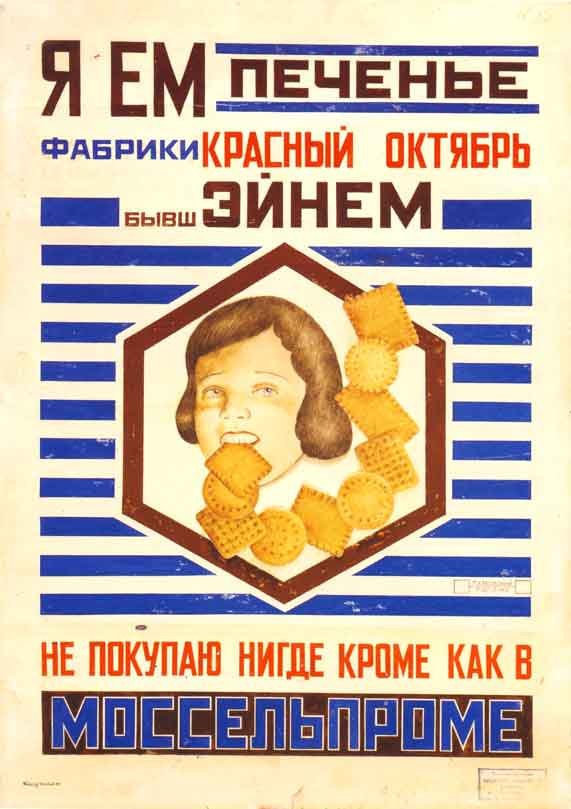
"I eat cookies from the Red October factory, the former Einem". Advertisement from the early Soviet era.

The company was founded by the German Theodor Ferdinand von Einem. Von Einem sold his stake in the enterprise to German Julius Heuss, who became its director in 1878, retaining the position until his death in 1907. In 1896, the Einem factory won a gold medal at the All-Russian Industrial and Artistic Exhibition, and it was allowed to supply confectionery to the court of the tsar.

At the turn of the 20th century, the Einem factory won chocolatiers' competitions across Europe, and its advertising was displayed prominently in Moscow. After the October Revolution of 1917, the company was nationalised and given its current name. During World War II, the factory reoriented its production towards the manufacturing of military rations, including high-caffeine chocolate.

After the dissolution of the Soviet Union, the company continued to use the Krasny Oktyabr name for its brand recognition, but it began to decorate the boxes and labels with Tsarist-era motifs. Krasny Oktyabr was privatised in 1993. In the 1990s, it became one of the few large business concerns in Moscow to be privatised successfully. At the same time, it had to compete with foreign companies such as Mars Inc.

== Alyonka ==
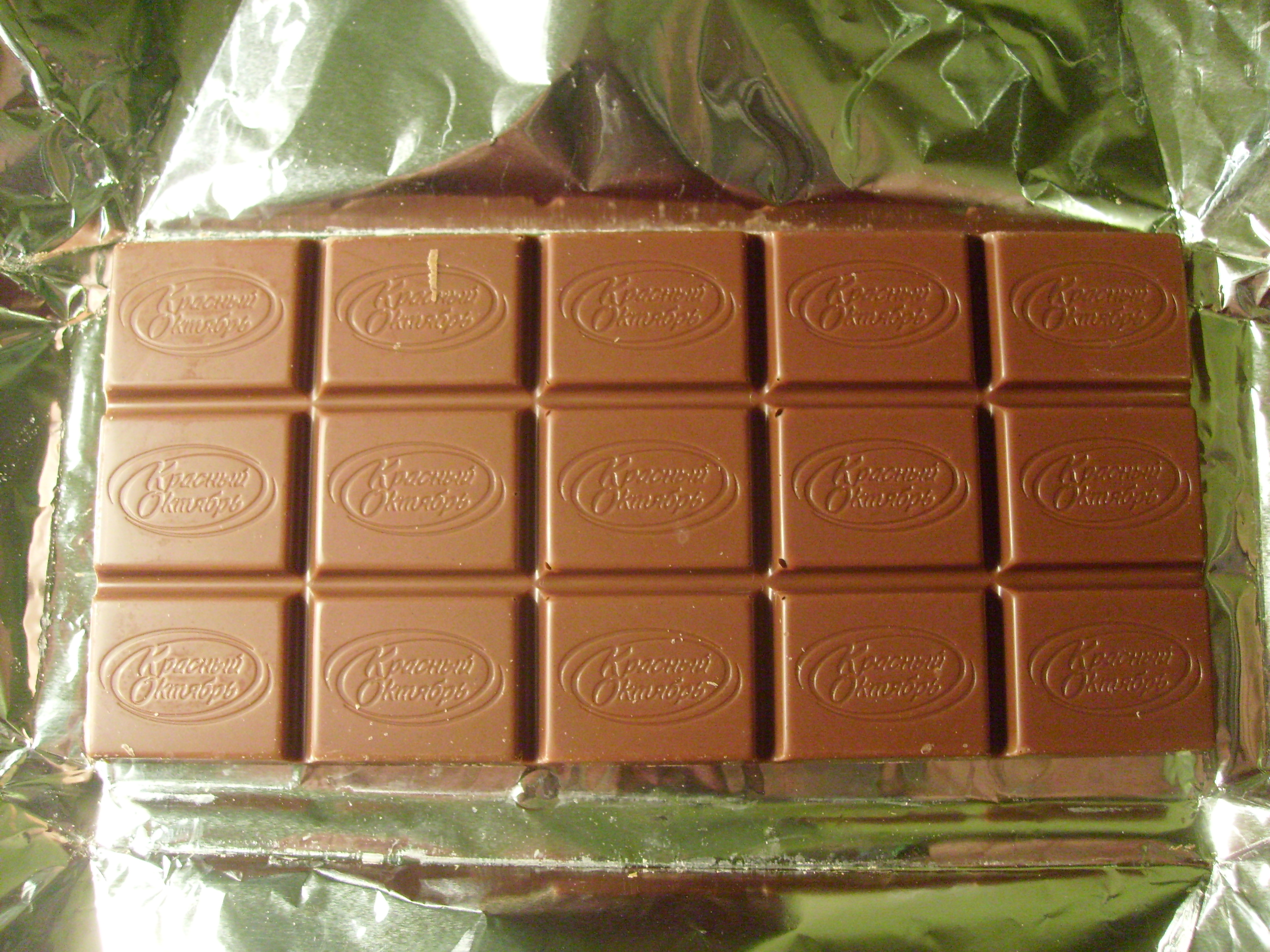
Alyonka chocolate

Produced since 1965, this is one of the most famous chocolate bars from the Krasny Oktyabr factory. Today, they are still just as popular as when they just arrived on the market. Alyonka can be described as a long thin bar of chocolate weighing 100 grams. The bar is subdivided into 3x5 tiles, each of which has the name of the factory imprinted on it in Russian — «Красный Октябрь».

The wrapper depicts a blue-eyed girl wearing a traditional Russian head scarf, who is presumably "Alyonka", an endearing form of the name Alyona. The illustration is based on a photograph of the daughter of one of the artists working at the factory. Though many women have claimed to have been the famous child, the company denies that the image was based on a real girl.

== Former production plant ==
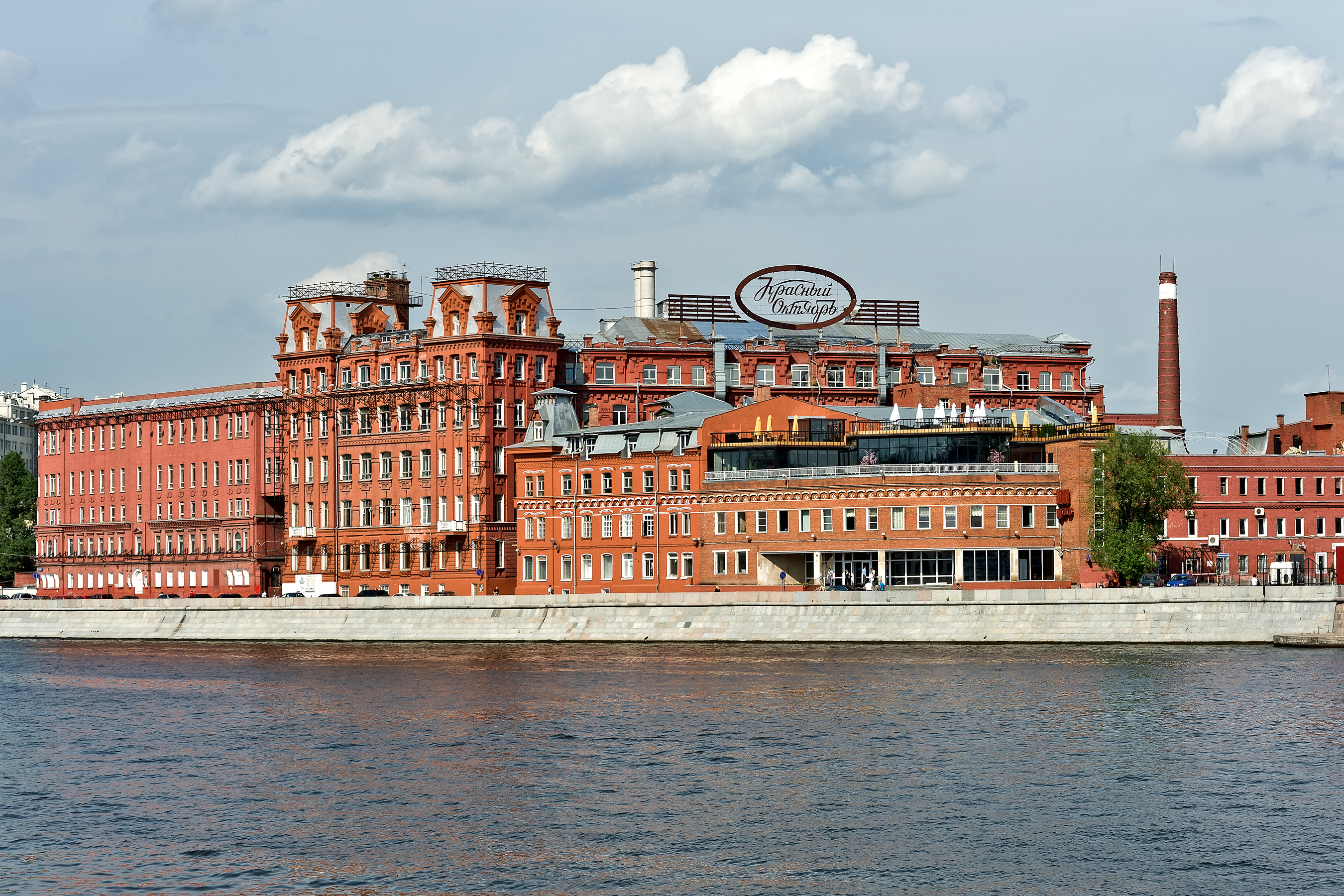
Former factory building of the "Red October" confectionery.

The production site of Krasny Oktyabr was formerly located on the Moskva River embankment, a couple of kilometres from the Kremlin. The plant was relocated to the outskirts of Moscow in 2007, and the famous red brick factory was redeveloped into apartment complexes, cafes, and restaurants.

The development hosts art and photo galleries and designer studios, being described as Moscow’s answer to New York’s Tribeca. Among the organisations to make use of the former factory site are the Strelka Institute, the Baibakov Art Projects, the Moscow Biennale (in 2009), and the Lumiere Brothers Center for Photography.
