= List of Polish desserts =

This is a list of Polish desserts. Polish cuisine has evolved over the centuries to become very eclectic due to Poland's history. Polish cuisine shares many similarities with other Central European cuisines, especially German, Austrian, and Hungarian cuisines, as well as Jewish, Belarusian, Ukrainian, Russian, French, and Italian culinary traditions.

== Polish desserts ==
Name	Image	Description
Andruty kaliskie		Light sweet, flat waffles
Babka (baba)		A sweet yeast cake that's also consumed in other areas of Eastern Europe
Budyń (kisiel mleczny)		A milk-based dish with the consistency of a thick gel, popular as a dessert.
Chałka		Sweet white wheat bread from Jewish cuisine
Chocolate-covered prune (śliwki w czekoladzie)		Chocolate with an entire dried plum as a filling
Ciepłe lody		Waffle cone filled with very sweet egg white mousse, sometimes topped with chocolate
Drożdżówka		Sweet roll made with yeast dough and variety of fillings
Faworki (or chrust)		Angel wings
Karpatka		A cream pie with custard-like filling.
Kisiel (kisiel owocowy)		A fruit dish with the consistency of a thick gel, popular as a dessert.
Keks		Cake with candied and dried fruit.
Kogel mogel		An egg-based homemade dessert popular in Eastern Europe made from egg yolks, sugar, and flavorings such as honey, cocoa or rum. It is similar to eggnog. A Polish variation includes the addition of orange juice, creating a taste similar to an Orange Julius.
Kołacz		A traditional Polish pastry, originally a wedding cake
Krówki		Polish fudge; semi-soft milk toffee candies.
Kutia		A sweet grain pudding, traditionally served in Ukraine, Belarus and some parts of Poland.
Strucla z makiem (makowiec)		Polish poppy seed roll. A pastry consisting of a roll of sweet yeast bread (a viennoiserie) with a dense, rich, bittersweet filling of poppy seed, raisins with almond essence.
Makówki		A traditional poppy seed-based dessert from Central Europe.
Mazurek (mazurek wielkanocny)		A variety of pastry (a cake) baked in Poland almost exclusively during Easter. Pictured is traditional home-made mazurek.
Mieszanka Wedlowska		E. Wedel mix; assorted chocolate covered candy
Miodek turecki	Miodek turecki by Maire	Candy sold during All Saints' Day and All Souls' Day at cemeteries in Kraków
Napoleonka (kremówka)		A Polish cream pie made of two layers of puff pastry, filled with whipped cream, creamy buttercream, vanilla pastry cream (custard cream) or sometimes egg white cream, and is usually sprinkled with powdered sugar.
Pączki		Pastries traditional in Polish cuisine; the Polish word pączki is often translated to English as "doughnuts".
Pańska Skórka		Hard taffy sold at cemeteries during Zaduszki and at Stare Miasto (Old Town) in Warsaw
Pawełek		Chocolate bar with a flavored filling that contains a small amount of alcohol.
Prince Polo		A mass-produced candy bar made in Poland. Pictured is the milk chocolate and hazelnut variety.
Ptasie mleczko		A soft chocolate-covered candy filled with soft meringue (or milk soufflé).
Ptyś		A round small cake, made with choux pastry, filled with cream (made with whipped cream) and sprinkled with powdered sugar.
Racuchy		Small pancakes often made with yeast dough often stuffed with apples and served with powdered sugar.
Rogal świętomarciński		Croissant stuffed with white poppy seeds, traditionally prepared in Poznań on the occasion of Saint Martin's Day
Ruchanki		Flat, oval racuchy from bread dough or sponge cake, hot fried on fat.
Rurki z kremem		Tubular-shaped pastries with sweet filling
Sękacz		A popular Lithuanian-Polish traditional cake. Dough is ladled on a rolling cylinder creating distinctive layers and characteristic peaks (sęki).
Sernik		A baked cheesecake is one of the most popular desserts in Poland, made primarily by using twaróg, a type of fresh cheese.
Szarlotka		Apple cake called szarlotka or jabłecznik is made from sweet crust pastry and spiced apple filling. It can be topped with kruszonka (crumbles), meringue, or a dusting of caster (powdered) sugar. An additional layer of budyń (milk kissel) sometimes can be found. In restaurants and cafes, it is usually served hot with whipped cream and coffee.
Toruń gingerbread (toruńskie pierniki)		A traditional Polish gingerbread often flavoured with honey.
Torcik Wedlowski		E. Wedel tart; a large, circular, chocolate covered wafer with hand-made decorations
Wuzetka		A chocolate sponge and cream pie originating from Warsaw

== See also ==
- List of Polish dishes
- Polish cuisine – desserts and sweets
- List of desserts
