= Wuzetka =

Polish chocolate sponge and cream pie

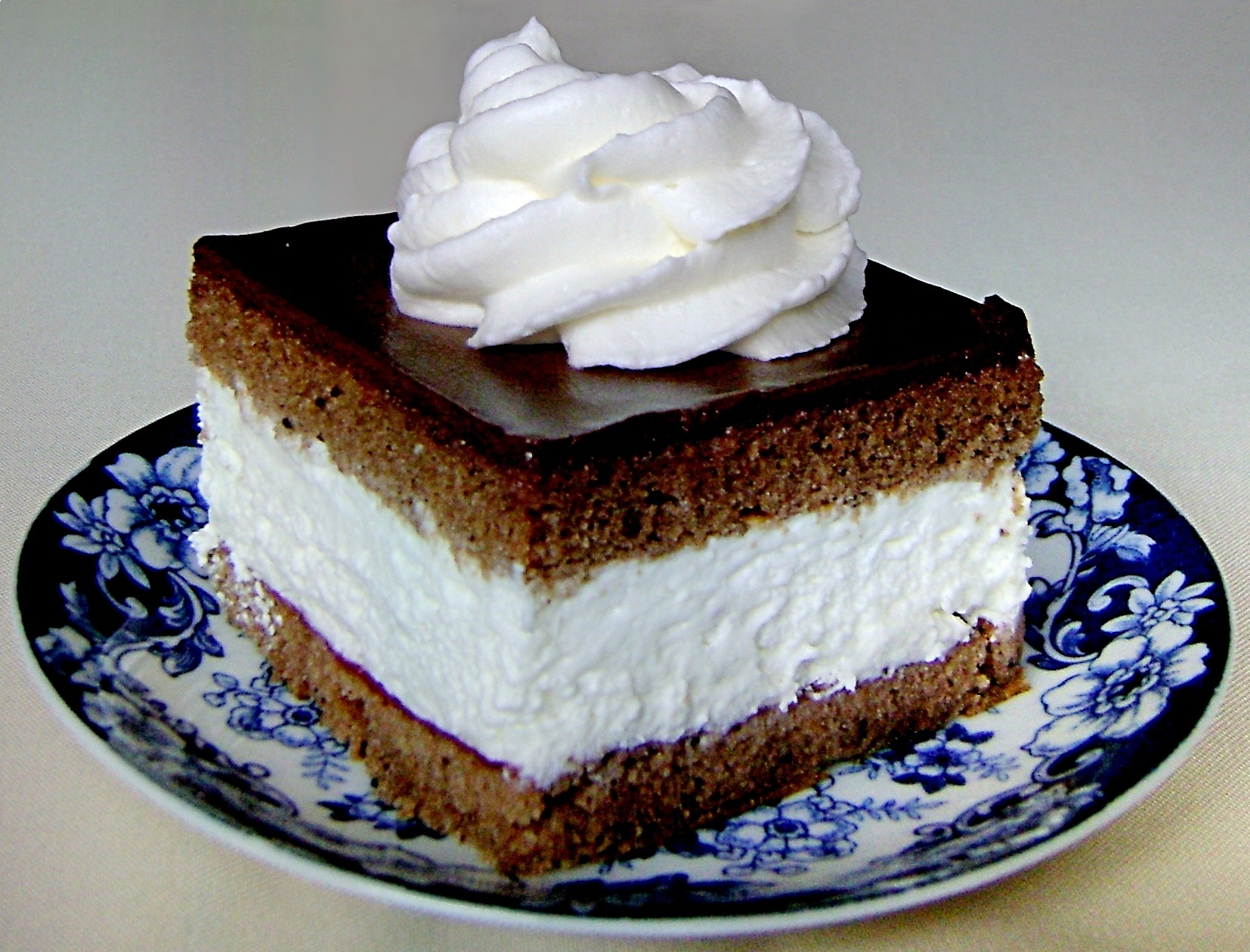
- Alternative names: W-Z cake
- Type: Sponge cake, cream pie
- Course: Dessert
- Place of origin: Poland
- Region or state: Warsaw
- Associated cuisine: Warsaw (Masovian) cuisine
- Main ingredients: Cocoa, wheat flour, eggs, sugar, marmalade or jam, whipped cream, gelatin, punch, chocolate pomade

Wuzetka (pronounced voo-zetka [vuzɛtka]) is a chocolate sponge and cream pie which originated in Warsaw, Poland. Its name is probably derived from the Warsaw W-Z Route, on which the confectionery that first began to sell the dessert in the late 1940s was located. Traditional to Varsovian cuisine, the dessert was exclusively served by cafés and restaurants in Warsaw, but soon became a beloved home-made food in Poland.

== History ==
The dessert most likely originated at the turn of the 1940s and 1950s in one of Warsaw's newly founded sweet shops. However, the precise origin of the name is debatable; historians and certain sources agree that the cake was probably named after the Warsaw W-Z Route (East-West Route), which ran next to the shop. Other sources state that the name comes from the acronym "WZC", which either stood for the Warsaw Confectionery Plants (Warszawskie Zakłady Cukiernicze) or for the Polish term "pastry with chocolate" (wypiek z czekoladą). The abbreviation "WZK" for "pastry with cream" (wypiek z kremem) is also a possibility.

The confectionery store was most likely situated somewhere near or in the "Kino Muranów" cinema building on 5 Andersa Street, in the Muranów district of Warsaw.

== Preparation ==
The two square chocolate layers of the cake are made of wheat flour, eggs, sugar and cocoa. The mixture is baked in the oven at 180 °C (356 °F) for 20–30 minutes. The baked layers are then dipped and soaked in punch. The top side of the bottom layer is thinly covered in marmalade, powidl or jam. A thick chocolate pomade coating is applied over the top of the cake. The cream filling is made of a 36% whipping cream, powdered sugar and gelatin. The pie is traditionally topped with a whipped cream twirl.

== See also ==
- List of Polish desserts
- Napoleonka
- Karpatka
