= Karpatka =

Polish cream pie

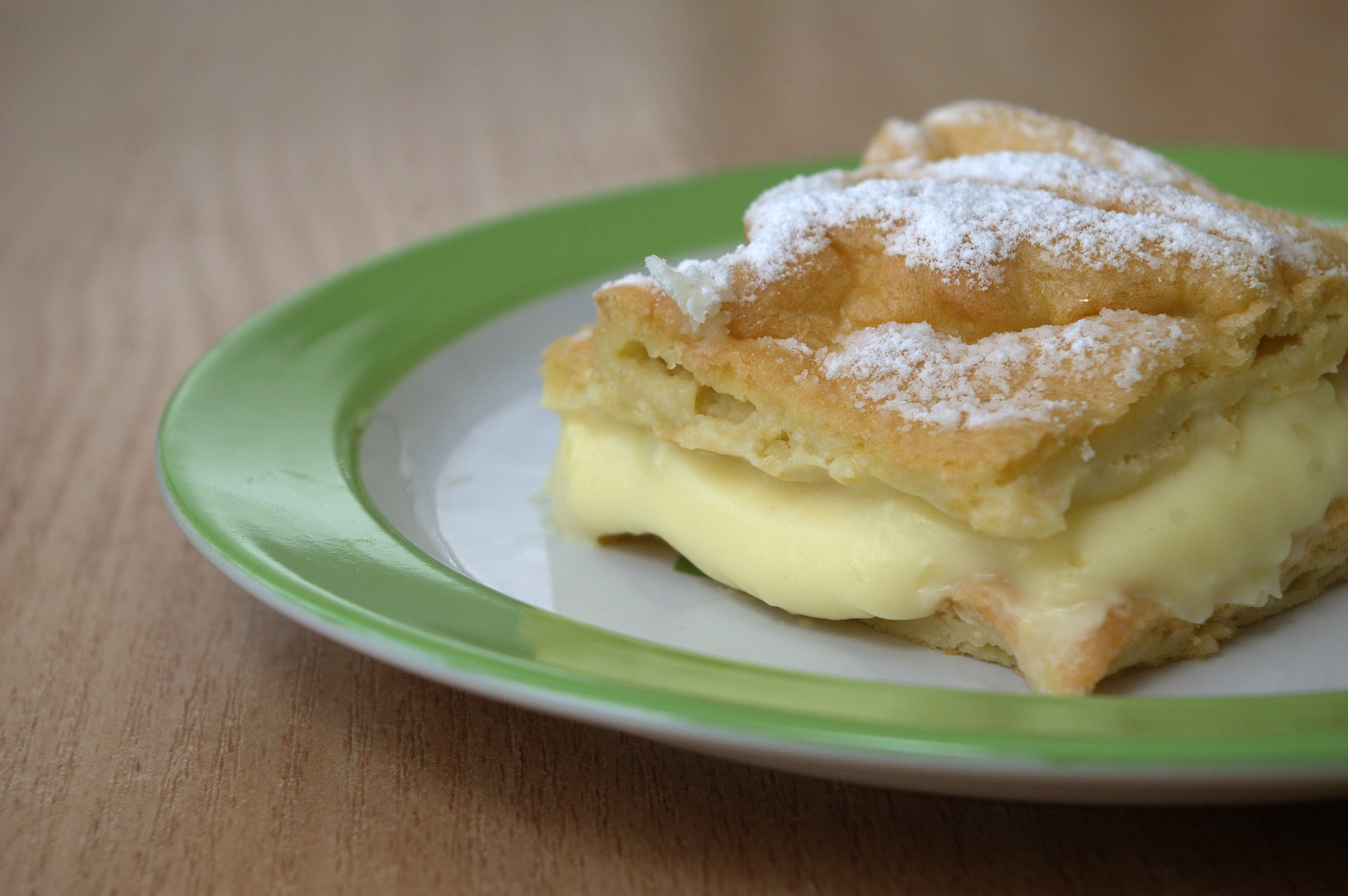
- Alternative names: Polish Carpathian cream cake
- Type: Cream pie
- Course: Dessert
- Place of origin: Poland
- Associated cuisine: Polish cuisine
- Main ingredients: Choux pastry, shortcrust pastry, cream filling, marmalade, icing sugar

Karpatka is a traditional Polish cream pie with some sort of vanilla buttercream filling – aerated butter mixed with eggs beaten and steamed with sugar (krem russel), aerated butter mixed with crème pâtissière (according to Polish gastronomy textbooks made from whole eggs) or just thick milk kissel enriched with melted butter. (Note: For the purposes of this article, it is assumed that any boiled cream made of milk kissel enriched with egg yolks (or whole eggs) qualifies as crème pâtissière) Professionally it is made of one sheet of short pastry covered with a layer of choux pastry with a thin layer of marmalade and a thick layer of cream in between. Nevertheless, the version with two layers of choux pastry is popular. The cake is cut into squares or rectangles and dusted with icing sugar.

The dessert takes its name from the mountain-like pleated shape of the powdered choux pastry, which resembles the snowy peaks of the Carpathian Mountains – Karpaty in Polish.

The origins of the dessert are unclear; it most likely emerged at the turn of the 1950s and 1960s, but its popularity only became widespread in the 1970s and 1980s. The official name "karpatka" was coined or recorded in 1972 by a group of philology students. Traditionally, one large slice of the pie was served with coffee or tea.

There are "karpatka" baking mixes available in shops across Poland. In 1995, "Karpatka" became a trademark registered for a company called Delecta for the determination of cream powder in the Polish Patent Office.

== See also ==
- List of Polish desserts
- Wuzetka
- Crumb cake
- Napoleonka
- Poppy seed roll
