= Miodek turecki =

Polish candy

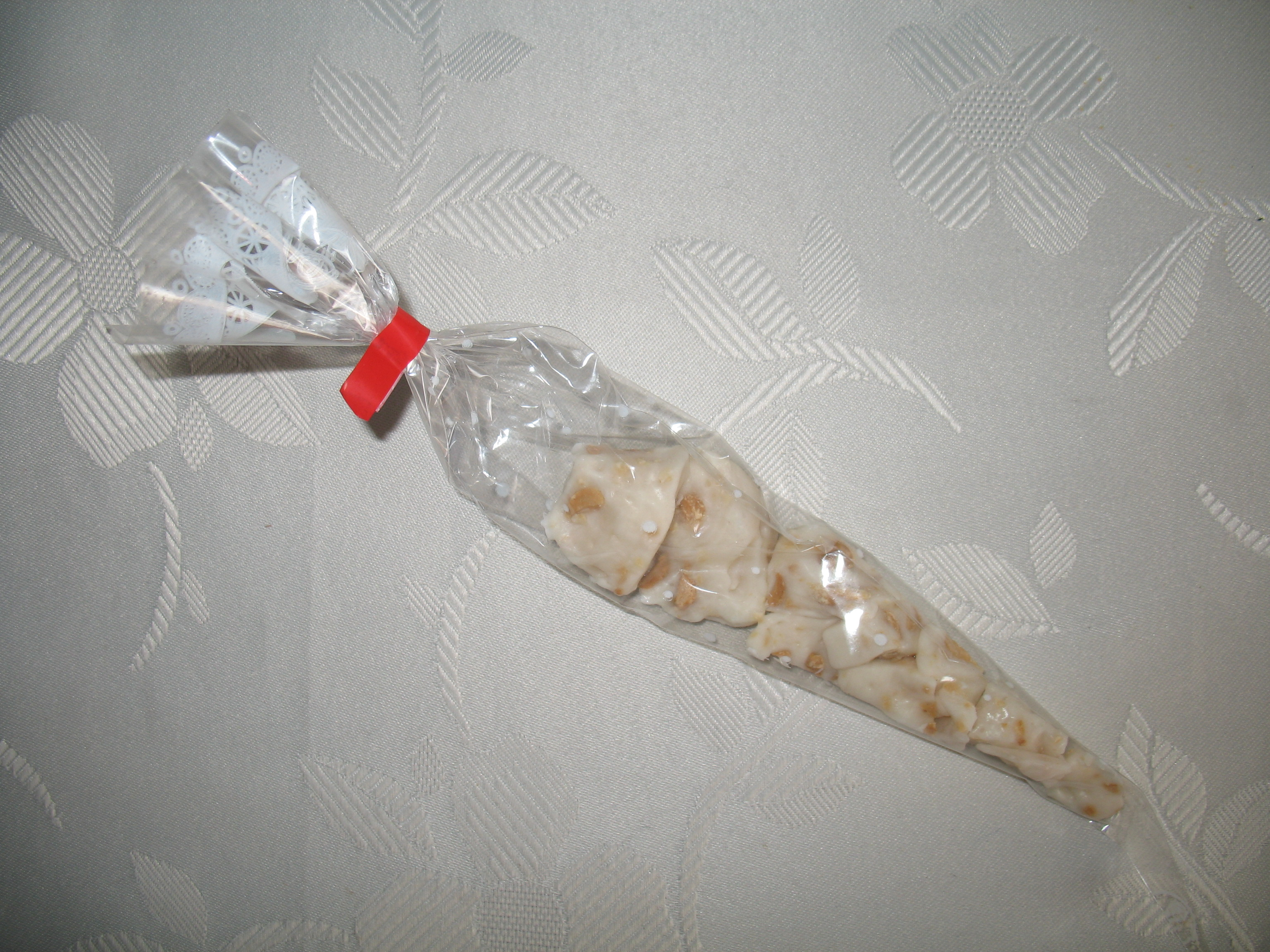
- Miodek turecki packed in rose-shaped plastic foil
- Type: Candy
- Course: Dessert
- Place of origin: Kraków, Poland
- Serving temperature: Cold
- Main ingredients: Caramel

Miodek turecki (English: Turkish honey) is a candy traditionally sold in Kraków, Poland, on the gates of cemeteries during All Saints' Day and All Souls' Day. Sometimes sold by churches during autumn parish festivals. Miodek turecki has an irregular shape, a hard topping with a light honey taste, which may either break apart or crumble, with its base ingredient being caramelised sugar with the addition of aroma oils and colourings, into which are blended crumbled nuts. The original miodek turecki is made from white caramel sweet cream, although other variations exist, dependent on the types of sweet additives and aromatics, e.g. miodek kakaowy (cocoa), kawowy (coffee) or waniliowy (vanilla).

== See also ==
- List of Polish candy
- Lesser Poland cuisine
- List of Polish desserts
- List of Polish dishes
