= Kissel =

Viscous fruit dish, served as dessert or drink

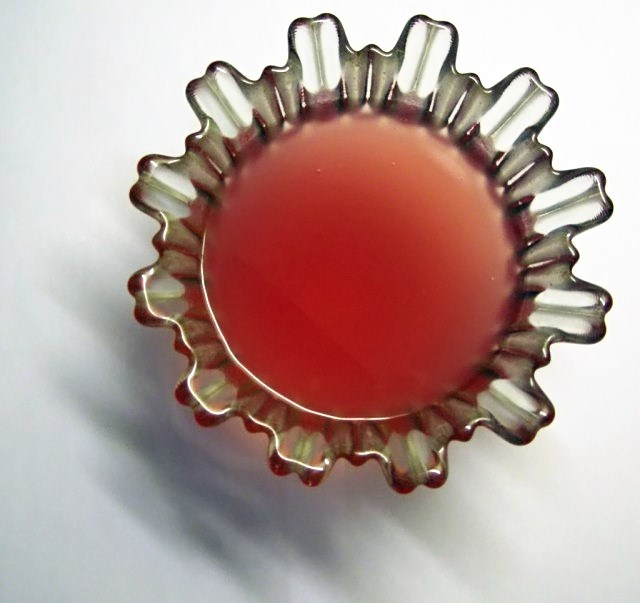
- Fruit kissel
- Alternative names: Kisel, kiisseli (Finnish); Kisiel (pl. kisiele) (Polish); Kysil (Ukrainian)
- Type: jelly
- Course: dessert or drink
- Region or state: Central and Eastern Europe, Russia and Finland
- Main ingredients: 1) fruit juice (or puree) or milk thickened with cornstarch or potato starch; 2) grain or oat flakes

Kissel or kisel (Note: Belarusian: кісель; Estonian: kissell; Finnish: kiisseli, IPA: [ˈkiːsːeli]; Latgalian: keiseļs; Latvian: ķīselis; Lithuanian: kisielius; Polish: kisiel, IPA: [ˈkʲiɕɛl]; Russian: кисель, romanized: kiselʼ, IPA: [kʲɪˈsʲelʲ]; Ukrainian: кисiль, romanized: kysil, IPA: [kɪˈs⁽ʲ⁾ilʲ].) is a dish with the consistency of a thick gel, and made of sweet fruits such as berries, grains (such as oatmeal, rye, wheat), peas, or milk. It is commonly thickened with potato starch or corn starch and may be served either as a drinkable dessert or as a thicker, jelly-like dish. It belongs to the group of cold-solidified desserts, although it can be served warm.

== Etymology ==
"Kissel" is derived from a Slavic word meaning 'sour', after a similar old Slavic dish — a leavened flour porridge (or weak sourdough) which was made from grain, most commonly oats, but any grain, including legumes like peas or lentils could be used. Bean kissels were typically not leavened, and lacked the sweetness of the modern variants.

== History ==
Grain-based kissels were known 9000 years ago in ancient Anatolia and Mesopotamia; they are mentioned in Sumerian and Akkadian texts. In ancient times, oatmeal kissel was prepared by the fermentation of oat milk. Descriptions of traditional grain-based kissel note that grains were soaked in water until starch was released and the mixture became lightly fermented.

In Russia, oatmeal, rye or wheat kissel was an everyday dish, but also a ritual one, eaten at funeral feasts. Hot oatmeal kissel was usually eaten with linseed or hemp oil. When cooled and solidified, it was cut and served with milk, jam or with fried onions. Pea-based variants were also prepared by boiling pea flour until thickened. After solidifying, they could be served as a jelly-like sour dish.

Oat-based kissel soup is one of the characteristic national dishes of Poland (żurek) and Belarus. In Poland’s Podlaskie region, ‘podlaski kisiel owsiany’ (Podlaski oat kissel) was added to the Ministry of Agriculture and Rural Development’s List of Traditional Products in 2022.

In old Polish cuisine, the name kisiel or kisielica was used for thick soups (slush, Polish: breja, plural breje) made of fish gelatin. In French cuisine there was a similar dish known, called gelée – a berry-fruit jelly-kissel made with addition of gelatin based on fish waste. Contemporary fruit kissels are solidified with starch and do not require fermentation, and therefore are easier to make. In the former Russian Empire, fruit kissels appeared in the late 19th century or at the beginning of the 20th, when affordable potato starch became easily available. In Western European languages, fruit and berry sweet kissels based on starch do not have a common name and may be called "fruit cereals", "gravy", "sautés", or "fruit sauces".

Other dishes closely related to starch-solidified kissels are rice pudding, flummery (British cuisine), Haferschleim (German), Lokum (Turkish), polenta (Italian) and mamalyga (Eastern-Roman).

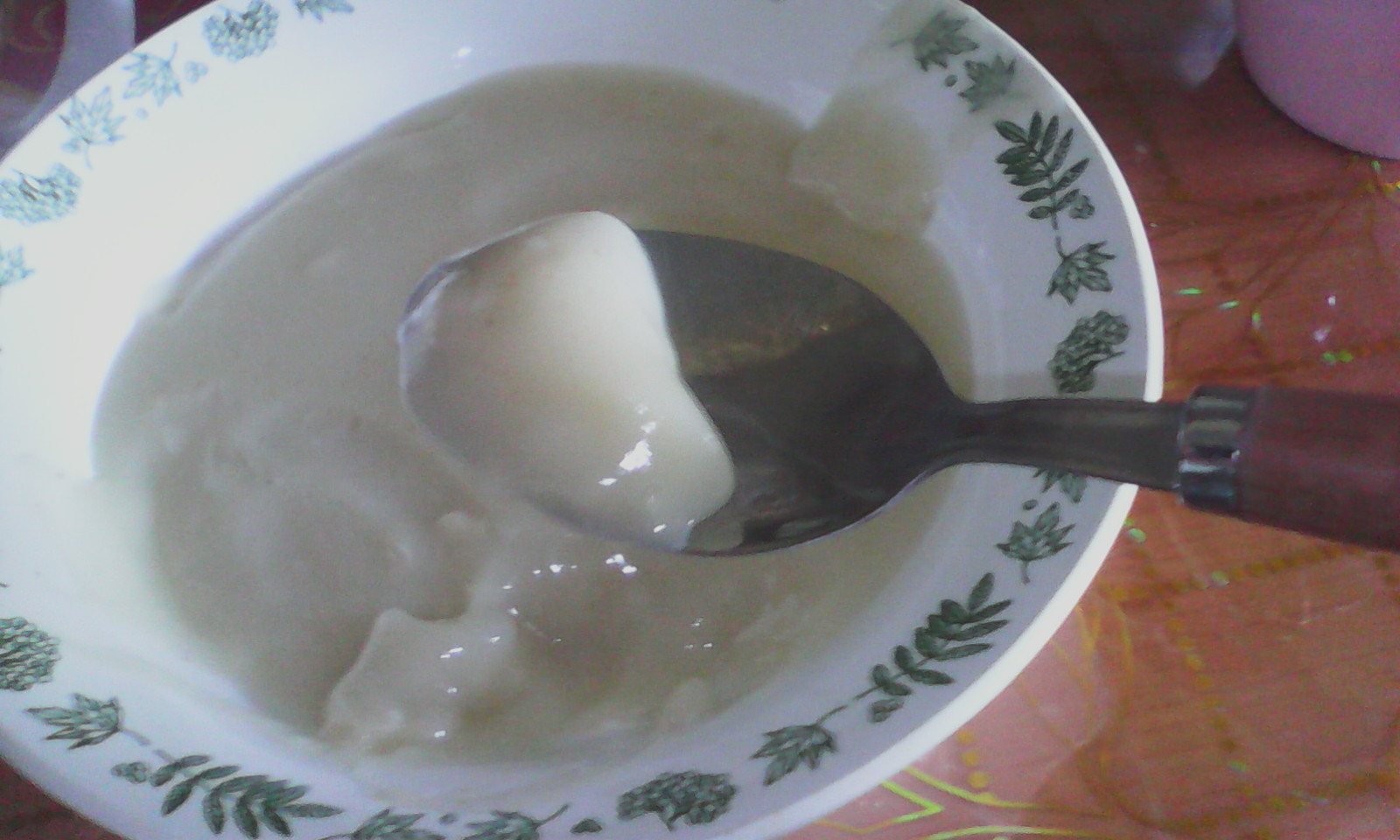
Sourdough kissel made from oat flakes and rye bread

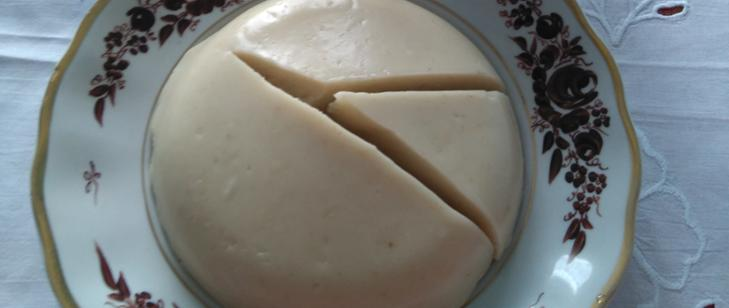
"Podlaski oat kissel" is on the Polish List of Traditional Products

== Fruit kissel ==
Fruit kissel is a viscous dish, popular as a dessert and as a drink in Northern, Central, and Eastern Europe. It consists of the sweetened juice (or puree) of berries. Sometimes red wine, fresh, or dried fruits are added as well. It is similar to mors, but usually thickened with cornstarch or potato starch; arrowroot may be used as a substitute as well. The thickness varies depending on how much starch is used and on the temperature. Thin kissel is most easily consumed by drinking, while thicker versions are almost like jelly and eaten with a spoon. Kissel can be served either hot or cold. It can be paired with sweetened quark or cream, or be served on pancakes or with ice cream.

It is similar to the Danish rødgrød and German Rote Grütze. Comparable berry-based preparations are also found elsewhere in northern Europe. Swedish blåbärssoppa is a similarly prepared bilberry soup or dessert.

Today, most Polish households prepare fruit kissel from instant mixes instead of the traditional way. The most popular flavours are strawberry, gooseberry, and raspberry. In Russia, the most popular flavours are cranberry, cherry, and redcurrant.

In Lithuania, cranberry kissel (Lithuanian: spanguolių kisielius) is a traditional meal eaten for Kūčios (Christmas Eve supper).

In Finland, kissel is often made of bilberries (since they can often be found growing wild in forests, and are thus both easy to gather and free), as well as from prunes, apricots, strawberries, etc. Rhubarb can also be used (see #Vegetable kissel), but is often combined with strawberries to produce a sweeter flavour. Kuningatarkiisseli ('Queen's kissel') is made with mixed berries and berry juices, generally bilberries and raspberries. Prune kissel (luumukiisseli) is traditionally eaten with rice pudding at Christmas.

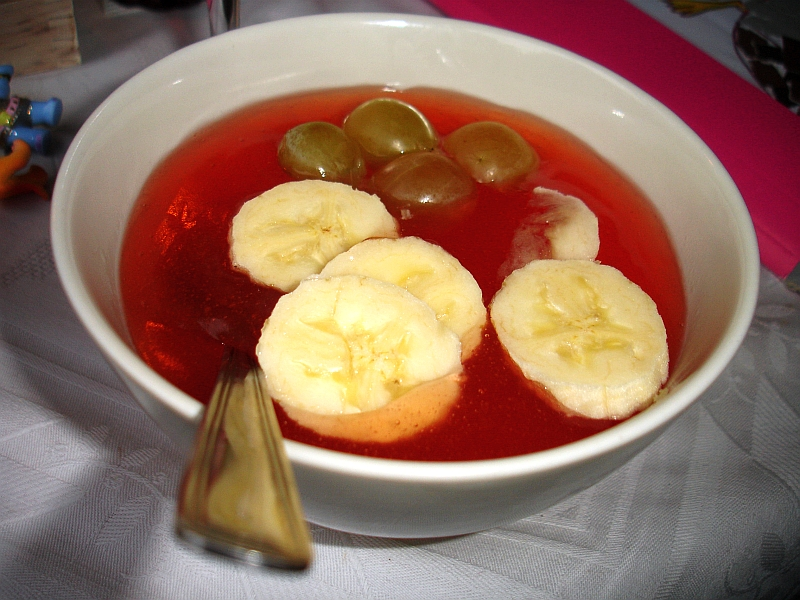
Commercial strawberry flavour kissel from Poland

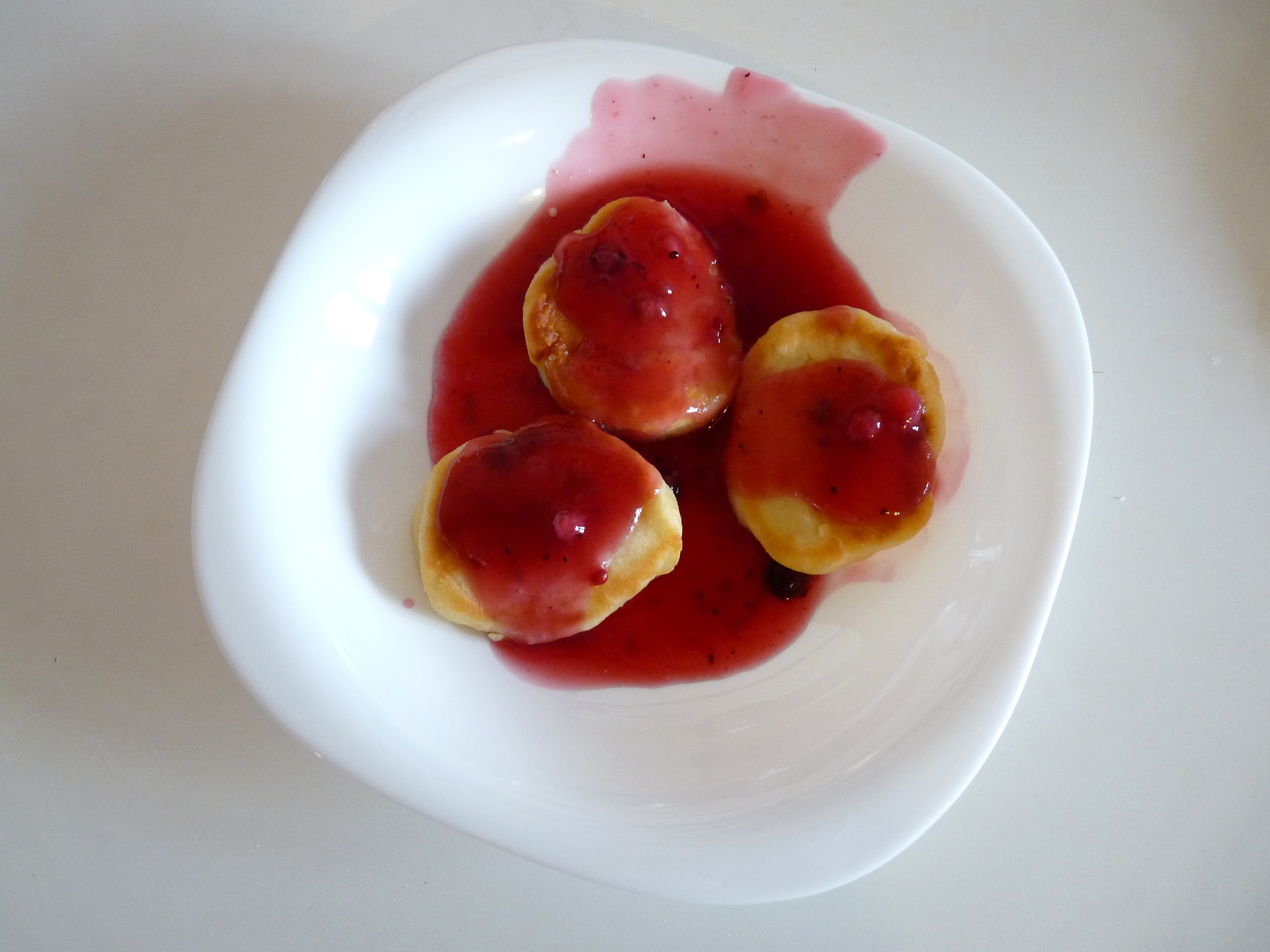
Russian syrniki with kissel

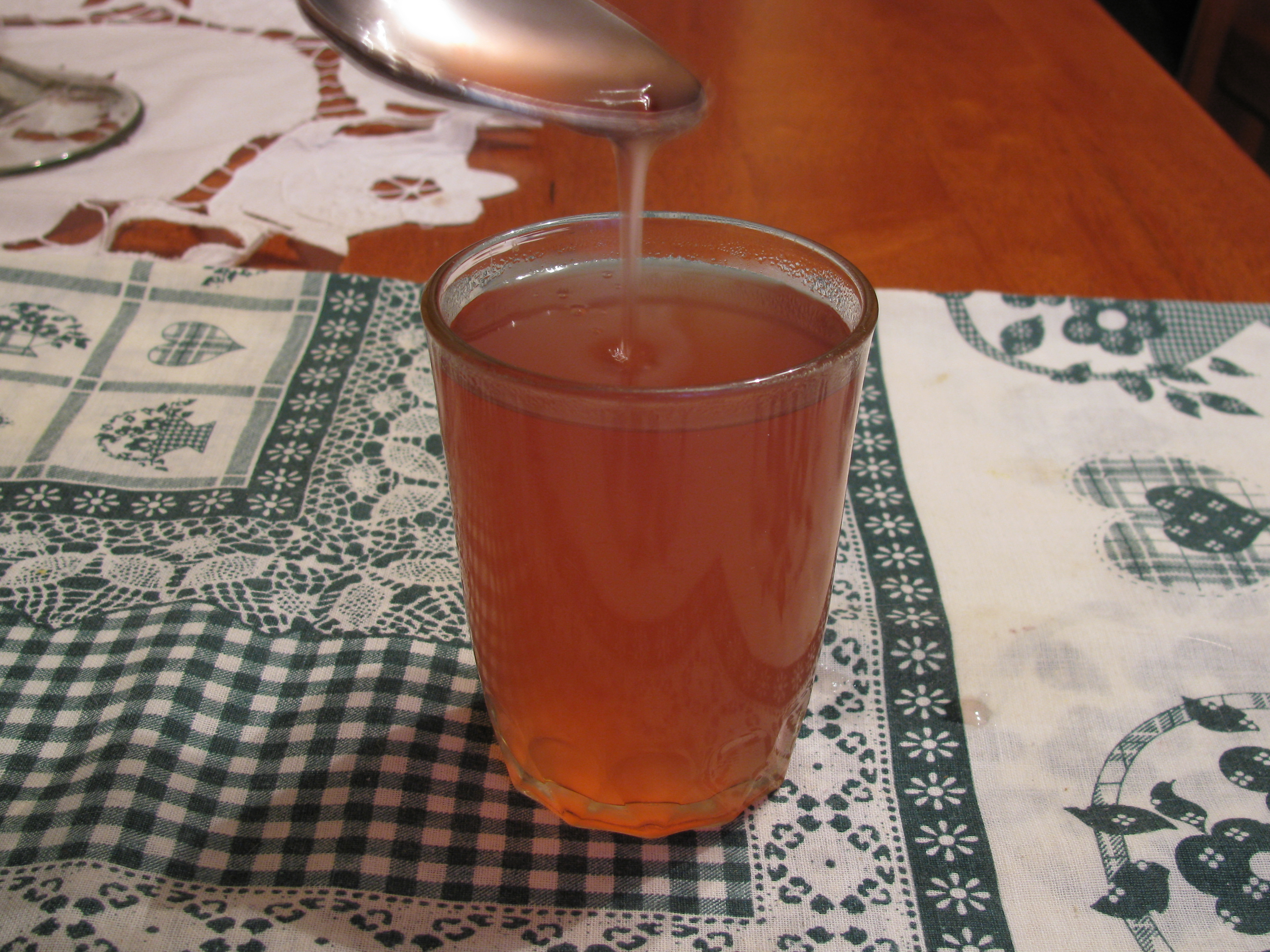
Ukrainian blackcurrant kissel as a drink

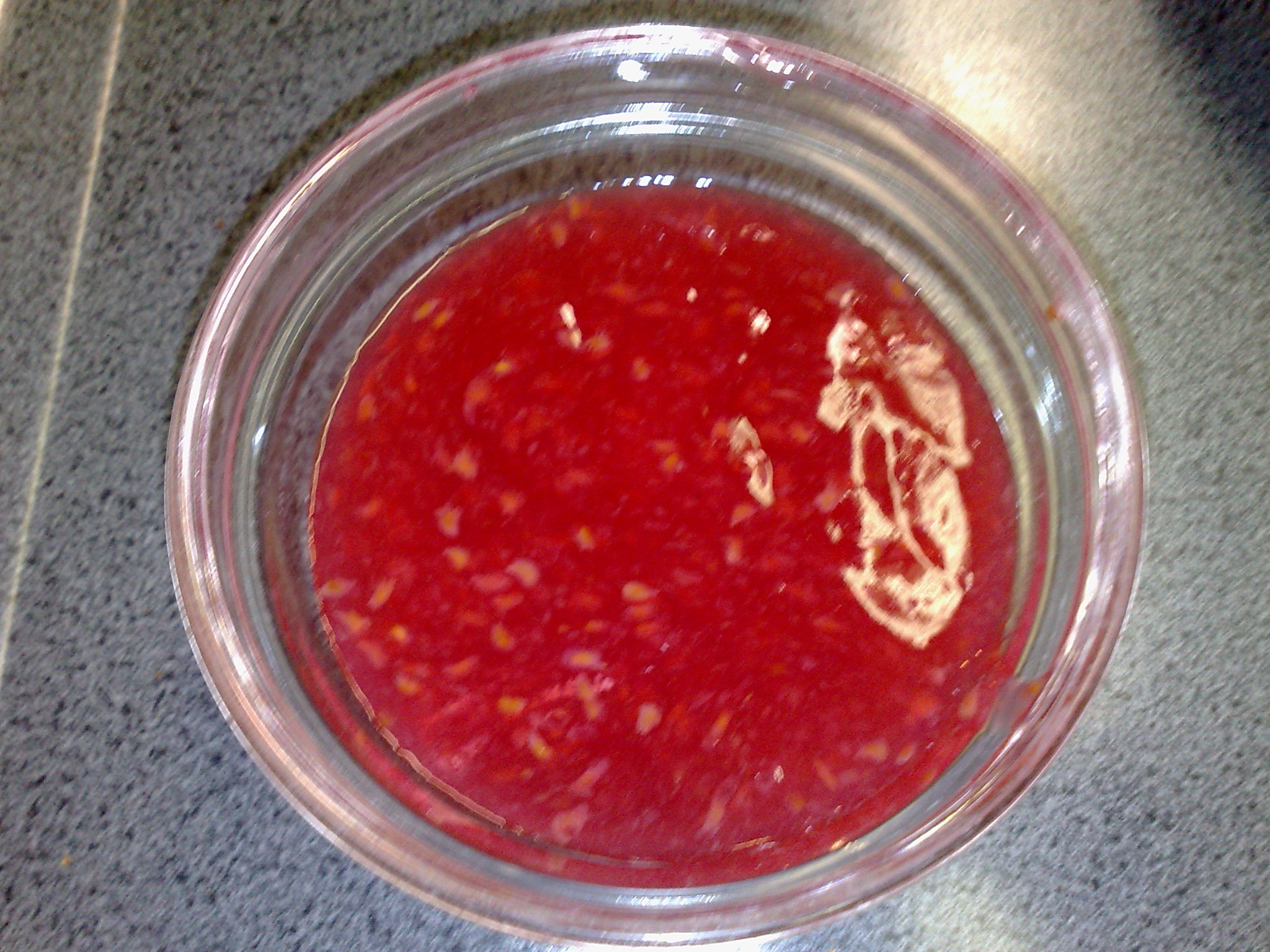
Finnish fruit kissel

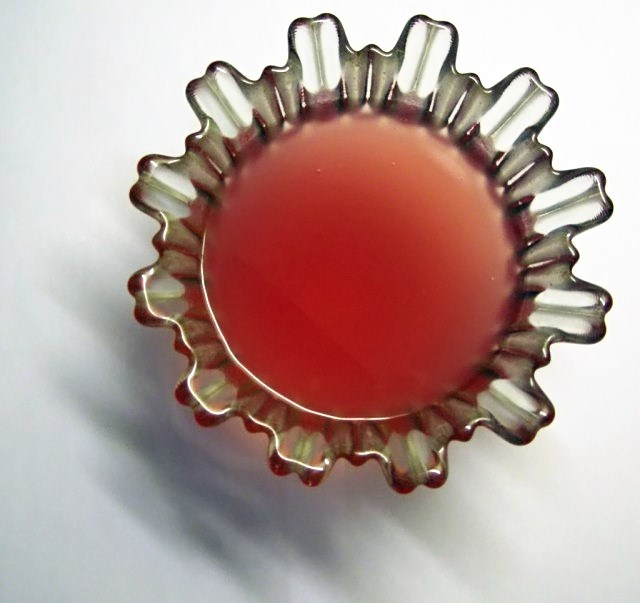
Red currant and gooseberry kissel

== Vegetable kissel ==
Less commonly, vegetable kissel is made from boiled or baked vegetables such as rhubarb, pumpkins, or beetroot.

== Milk kissel ==
Milk kissel (Polish: budyń or kisiel mleczny; Finnish: maitokiisseli) is a creamy pudding, similar to semolina pudding or budino. It is made from milk and potato starch (Poland) or corn starch (Finland) and flavoured with sugar and vanillin (or vanilla) or cocoa powder. It can also be enriched with the addition of butter and yolks.

It may be eaten as a dessert by itself, or garnished with fruit syrups, sauces, jams, fresh or dried fruit, or cookies and biscuits.

It may also be used as an ingredient in cake creams (i.e. for karpatka or napoleonka). Most Polish households prepare milk kissel from instant mixes instead of the traditional way.

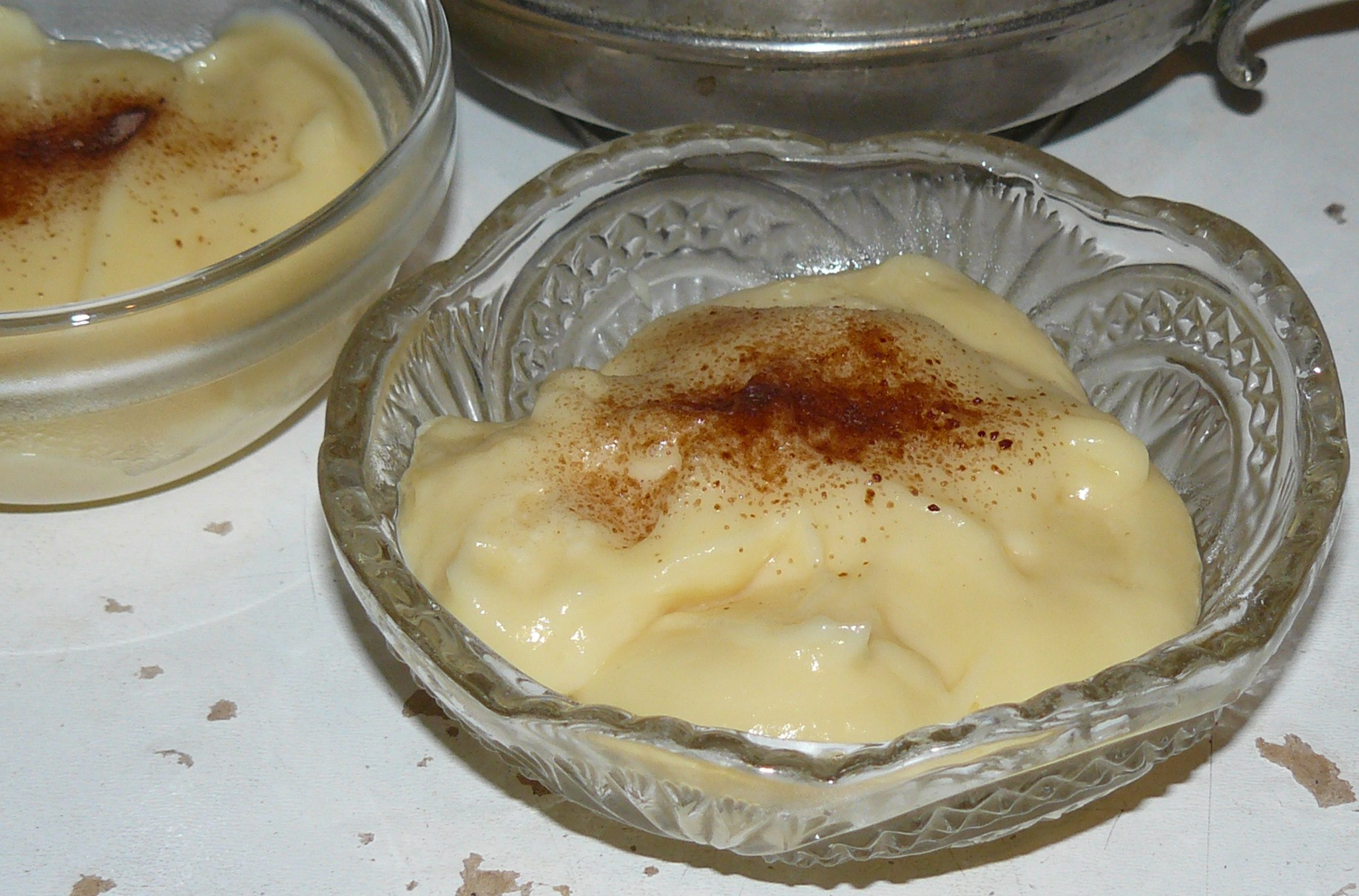
Milk kissel sprinkled with chocolate

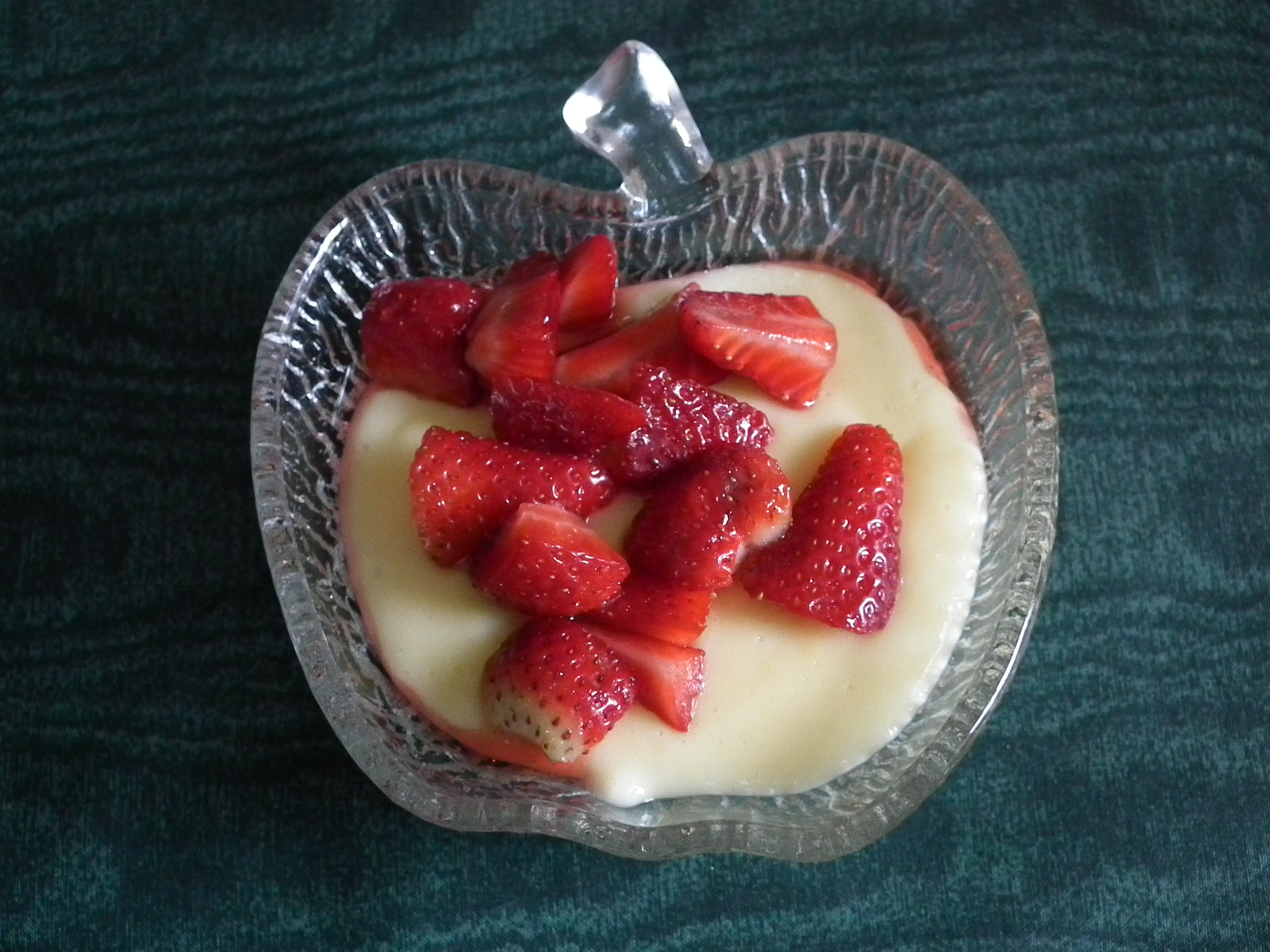
Vanilla milk kissel with strawberries

== Cultural references ==
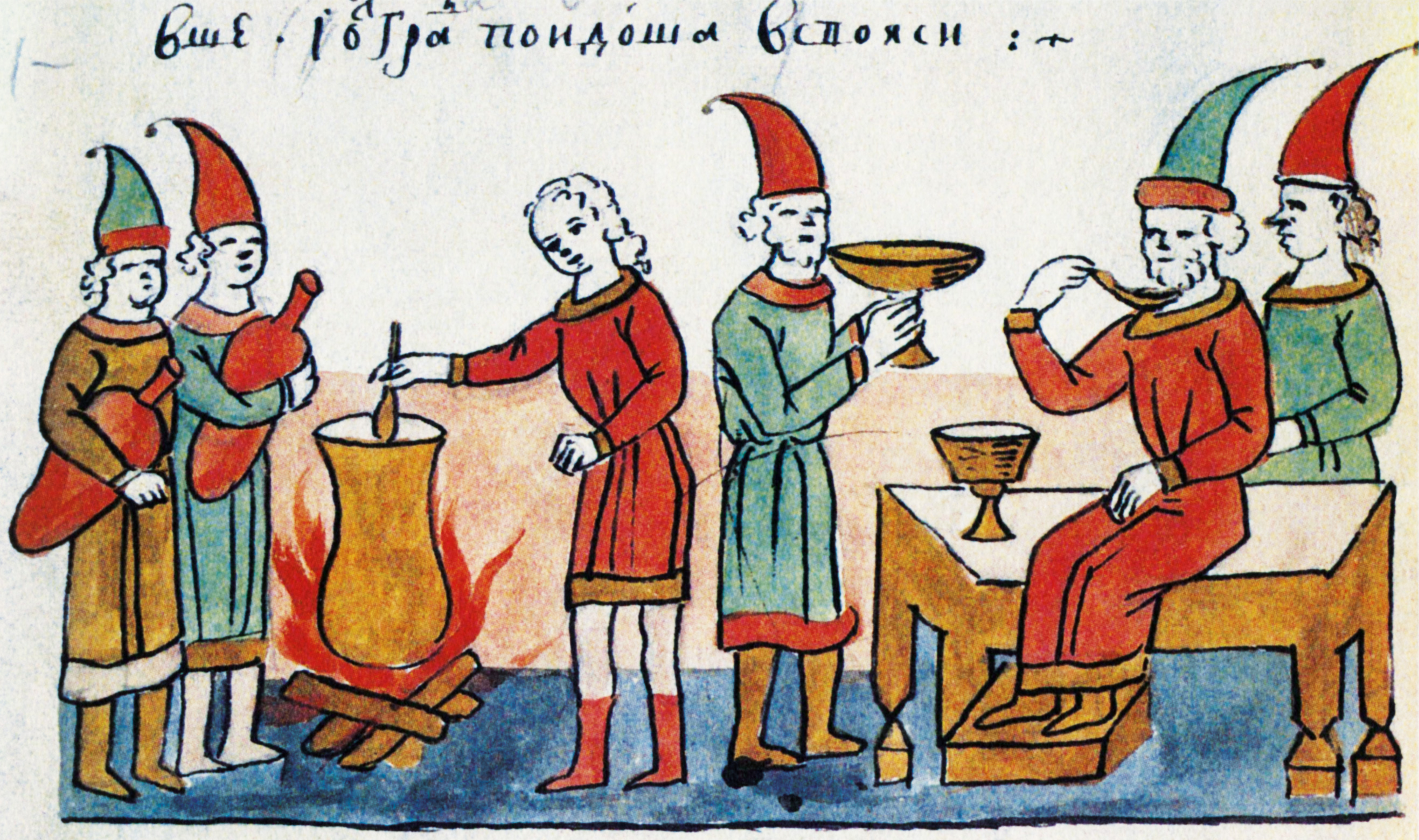
Brewing of kissel in Belgorod, miniature from the Radziwiłł Chronicle.

Kissel is mentioned in the Primary Chronicle, where there is a story of how it saved the city of Belgorod in Kievan Rus', besieged by nomadic Pechenegs in 997. When the food in the city became scarce, the population followed the advice of an old man, who told them to make kissel from the remnants of grain, and a sweet drink from the last mead they could find. They filled a wooden container with the kissel, and another one with the mead drink, and put those containers into the holes in the ground, and built two fake wells over them. When the Pechenegian ambassadors came into the town, they saw how the inhabitants took the food from these "wells", and were allowed to taste the kissel and mead beverage. Impressed, the Pechenegs decided to lift the siege and leave the city, having concluded that the Ruthenians were mysteriously fed from the earth itself.

In Russian fairy tales, the land of marvels (similar to Cockaigne) is described as the land of "milk rivers and kissel banks". (Note: Russian: молочные реки и кисельные берега, romanized: molochnyye reki i kisel'nyye berega, Ukrainian: молочні ріки і киселеві береги, romanized: molochni riky i kyselevi berehy) This expression became an idiom in Russian for a prosperous life or "paradise on earth".

Another phrase common in Russia and Poland, "the seventh water after kissel", (Note: Polish: siódma woda po kisielu Russian: седьмая вода на киселе, romanized: sed'maya voda na kisele, Ukrainian: сьома вода на киселі, romanized: sʹoma voda na kyseli) is used to describe a distant relative. Russian phraseological references also gloss the expression as describing someone in an extremely distant degree of kinship and connect its origin to the layer of ‘water’ that can separate from standing kissel.

== See also ==
- Pelamushi
- Almond tofu
- Blåbärssoppa
- Compote
- Kompot
- List of desserts
- List of fruit dishes
- Tong sui
