= Napoleonka =

Layered puff pastry dessert from Poland

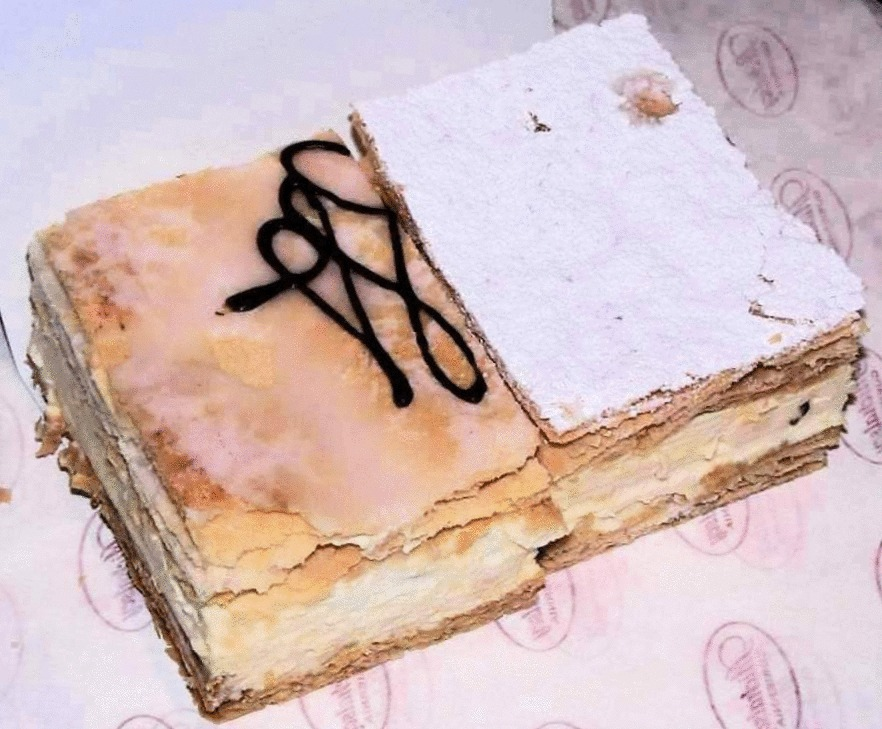
- Two typical kremówkas
- Alternative names: Kremówka (slang)
- Type: Cream pie
- Place of origin: Poland
- Main ingredients: Puff pastry filled with cream

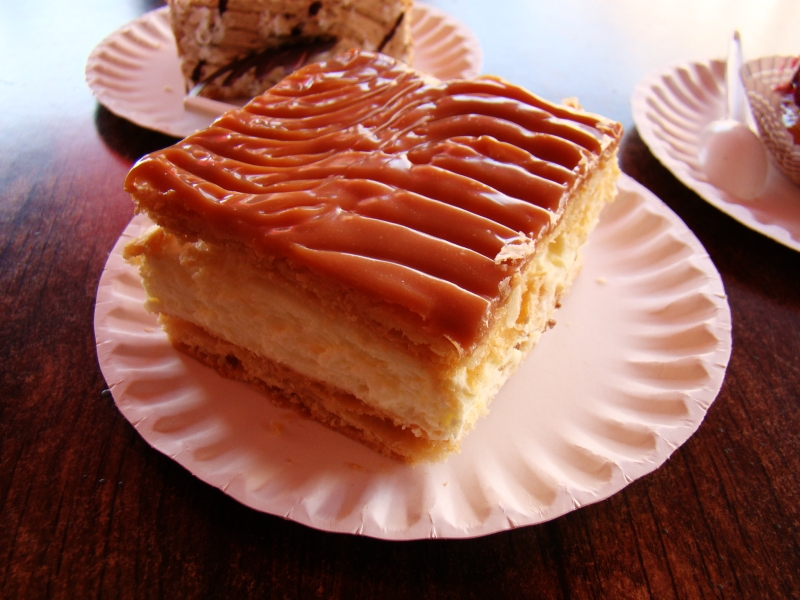
Kremówka

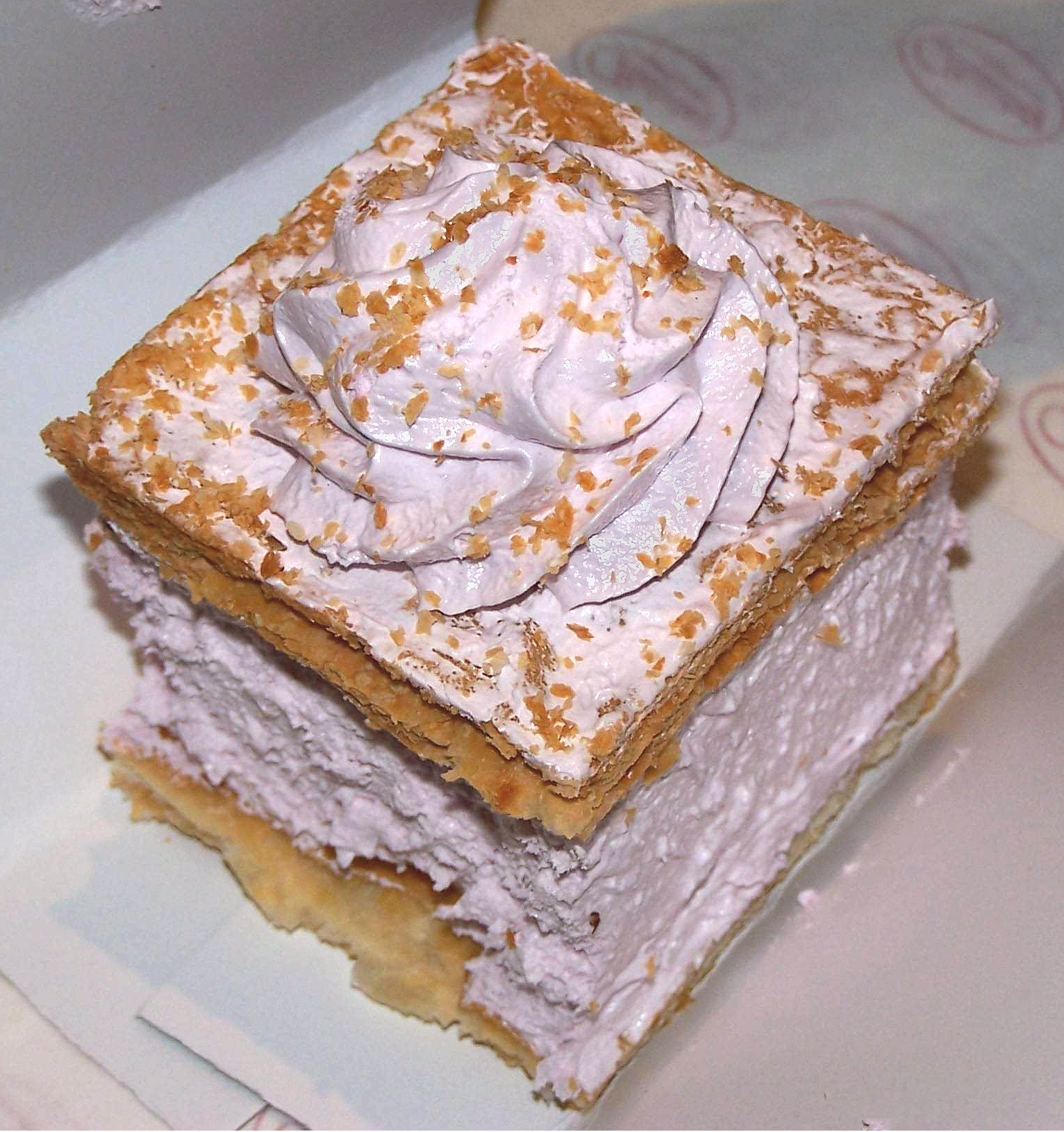
Napoleonka with egg white cream

Napoleonka (Polish: [napɔlɛˈɔnka]; colloquially kremówka (Polish: [krɛˈmufka]), is a Polish type of cream pie. It is made of two layers of puff pastry, filled with whipped cream, crème pâtissière (according to Polish gastronomy textbooks made from whole eggs; some versions consist of melted butter) or just thick milk kissel enriched with melted butter, (Note: For the purposes of this article, it is assumed that any boiled cream made of milk kissel enriched with egg yolks (or whole eggs) qualifies as crème pâtissière.) or sometimes filled with egg white cream. It is usually sprinkled with powdered sugar but it also can be decorated with cream or covered with a layer of icing.

In some places in Poland the cake is known as kremówka (roughly translated as "cream cake"), in others, it is called napoleonka. This Polish "war" between names kremówka and napoleonka has been subject to a satirical drawing by the Polish illustrator Andrzej Mleczko.

The cake is a variation of mille-feuille. a French dessert made of three layers of puff pastry filled with cream or jam, also known as the Napoleon.

Sometimes kremówkas containing alcohol are sold. These became popular particularly in the aftermath of a false story that Pope John Paul II was fond of that variant. In fact, the Pope was fond of the traditional kremówka.

== Papal cream pie ==
On 16 June 1999 Pope John Paul II mentioned that after he had completed his matura exam, he had cream cakes with his friends in his home town of Wadowice. They wagered who could eat more. The future Pope ate eighteen cream cakes, but did not win the bet.

And there was a cake shop. After high school final exam, we went for cream cakes. That we survived that all, those cream cakes after the final exam....

— Pope John Paul II

This was publicized by media, and "papal" cream cakes from Wadowice became popular in Poland.
The confectionery shop where the Pope ate cream cakes was owned by Austrian confectioner, Karol Hagenhuber, who came to Poland from Vienna. It was located in Wadowice Town Square. Some speculated that the original papal kremówkas contained alcohol, but this was denied by Hagenhuber's son, Karol. According to him his father's cakes were non-alcoholic kremówkas, made with all natural ingredients, using a unique recipe that was lost with the death of his father. Either way this led to renewed, and even international fame for the cake, rebranded as "papal".

In 2007, to celebrate Pope John Paul's II 87th birthday, a giant kremówka was baked in Rzeszów. Kremówkas remembered by Pope John Paul II were filled with cream made of whipped butter mixed with crème pâtissière made of whole eggs. This is the typical filling for karpatka.

== See also ==
- Kremna rezina (kremšnita)
- Tompoes (tompouce)
- List of custard desserts
- List of desserts
- List of Polish desserts
