= Ruchanki =

Fried bread of Polish origin

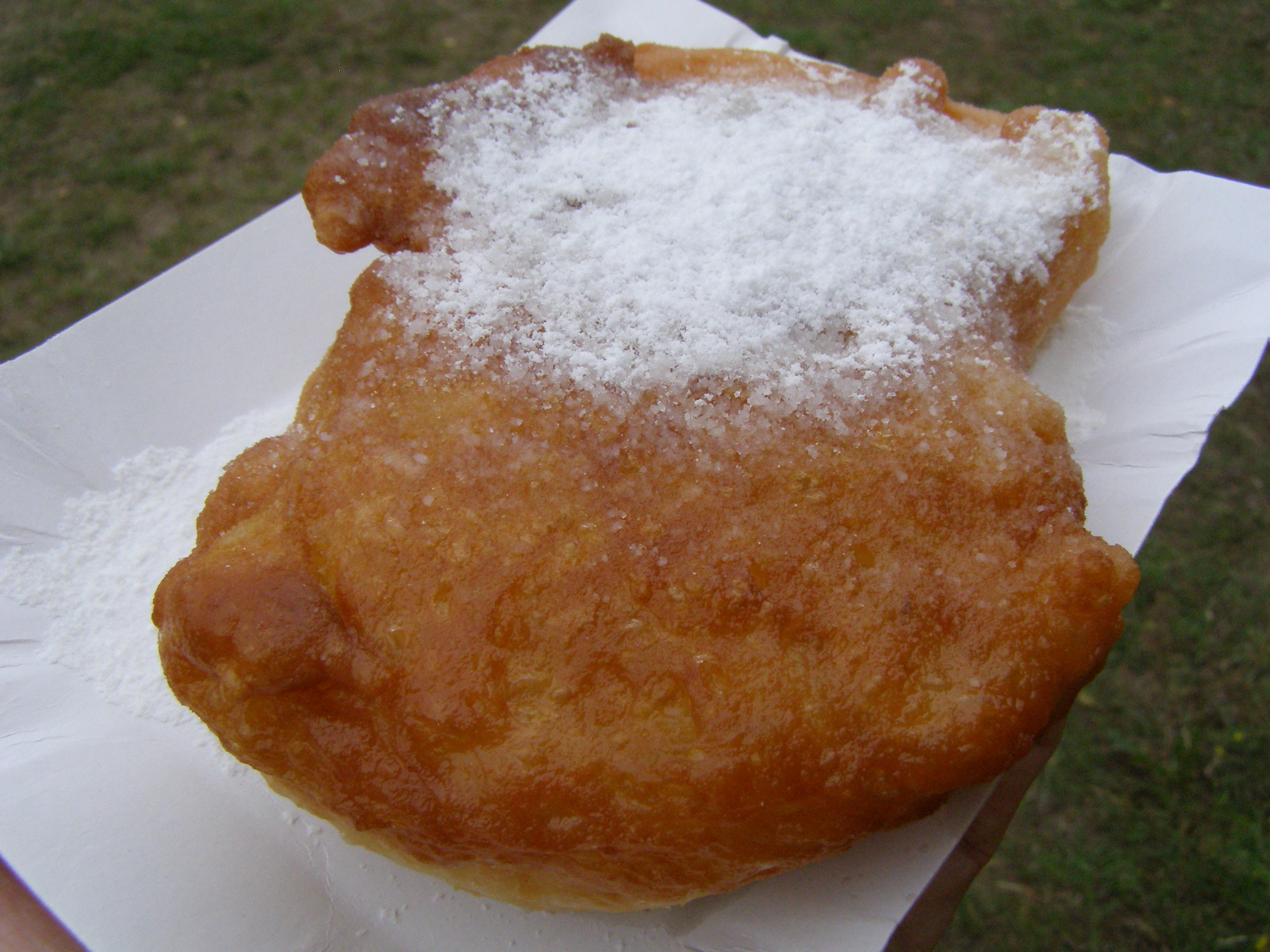
- Ruchanki at Wdzydze Kiszewskie Fair
- Type: Bread
- Course: Side dish, dessert
- Place of origin: Kashubia, Poland
- Serving temperature: Hot
- Main ingredients: Dough: flour, sodium bicarbonate

Ruchanki is a flat, oval racuszki from bread dough (providing a light sour taste) or sponge cake (sweet taste), fried on hot fat.

Formerly, ruchanki were produced from leftover bread dough. The rye bread dough version was popularly eaten instead of bread for breakfast. Ruchanki baked from wheat flour and yeast were traditionally baked for carnivals. These are served hot, topped with powdered sugar or white sugar. In Kashubia these are served with apples.

Ruchanki are enlisted on the list of traditional produce of the Pomeranian Voivodeship. The official list states, that the average diameter of ruchanki should be between 5 and 7 cm and their thickness at 0.5 cm.

== See also ==
- Pomeranian cuisine
- Fried dough
