= Pańska skórka =

Polish confectionery

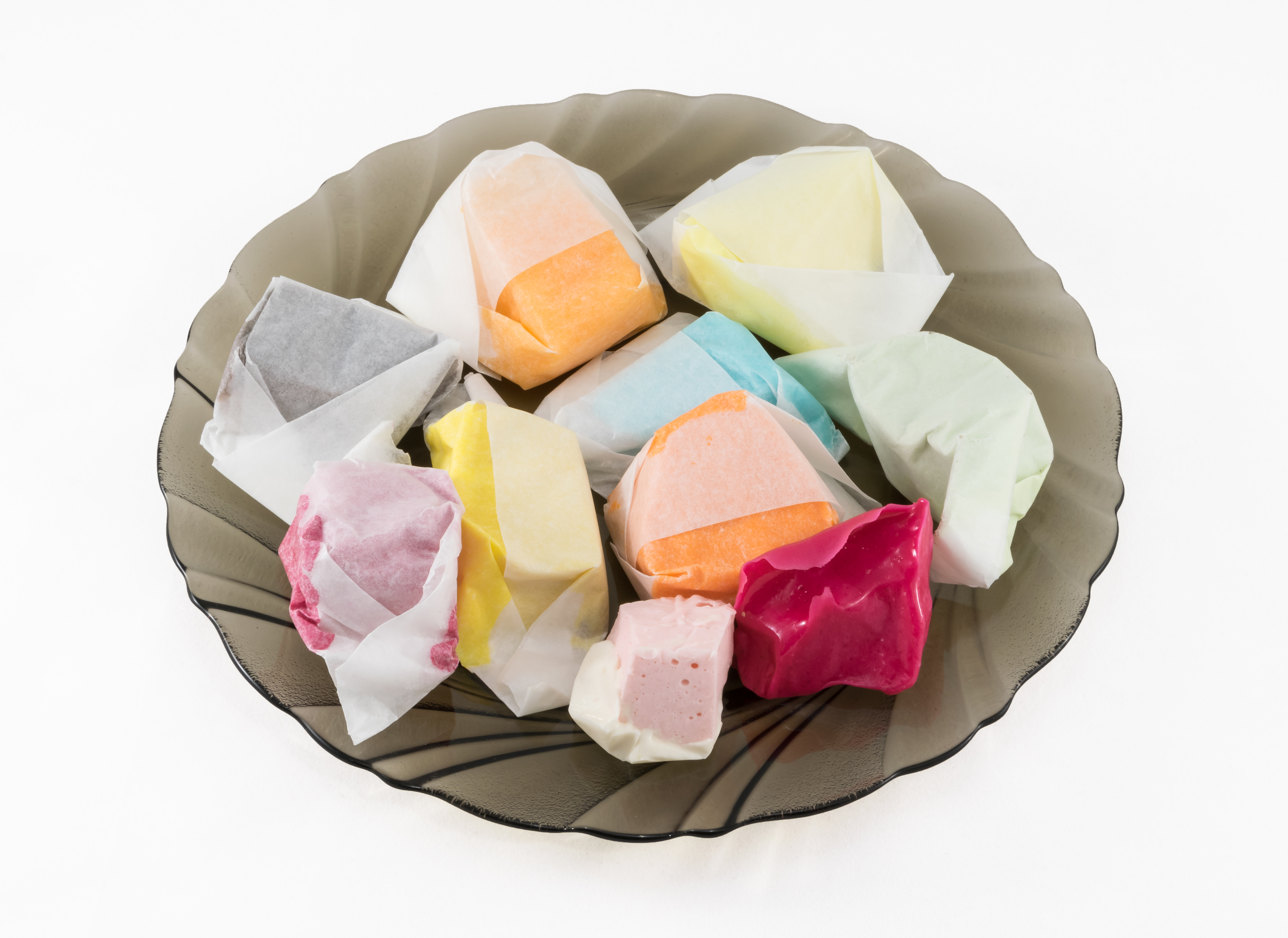
Variety of pańska skórka candies

Pańska skórka (Polish: [ˈpaɲska ˈskurka], pl: Lord's leather or lord's skin, depending on the translation) is a traditional homemade candy, wrapped in parchment paper and sold mainly in and around Warsaw.

== Recipe ==
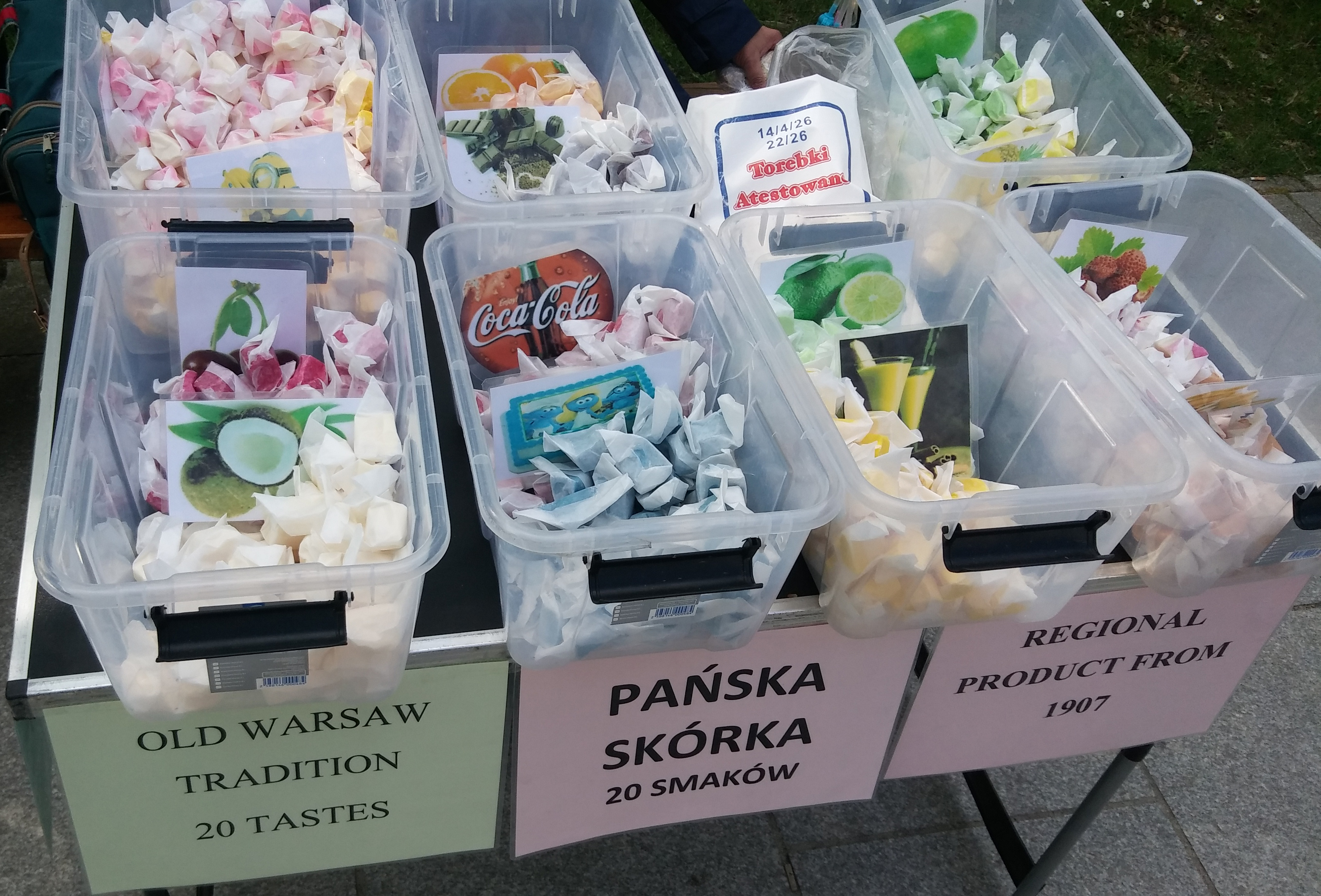
Non-traditional pańska skórka, clockwise: green apple, raspberry, limeade, cola, coconut, “Minion” flavored, orange and chocolate.

The candy is made of sugar, water, syrup, egg whites whipped with a pinch of salt, gelatin, some kind of flavoring, pink fruit juice (usually raspberry) and potato flour. After the batter is cooked, it is poured onto a flat sheet and, after cooling down, cut into squares about 3 cm wide. Pańska skórka is most often very sweet, with a delicate caramel-almond flavor, if made with the traditional recipe in mind. It is usually white and pink, although nowadays a variety and flavors and corresponding colors can be purchased, including for example cola or bubble gum.

According to one of the many origin stories, the confectionery was invented in 19th century in Praga district. The following recipe was provided by the historic records: "Of the purest gum arabic, pour half a pound of spring or river water into a saucepan and cook over high heat until it dissolves, and when it is dissolved, strain through a flannel, and when it has completely cooled, add a pound of finely ground sugar and put it on the coals, cook slowly, as it starts to steam from the boiler, the mass will thicken, mix quickly, add a little foam from 8 egg whites, beat so that it is not too heavy, then remove from the heat and immediately put into paper molds [covered] in vegetable oil or the best olive oil. Pour again almond oil or olive oil on top and store in jars".

== History and cultural context ==
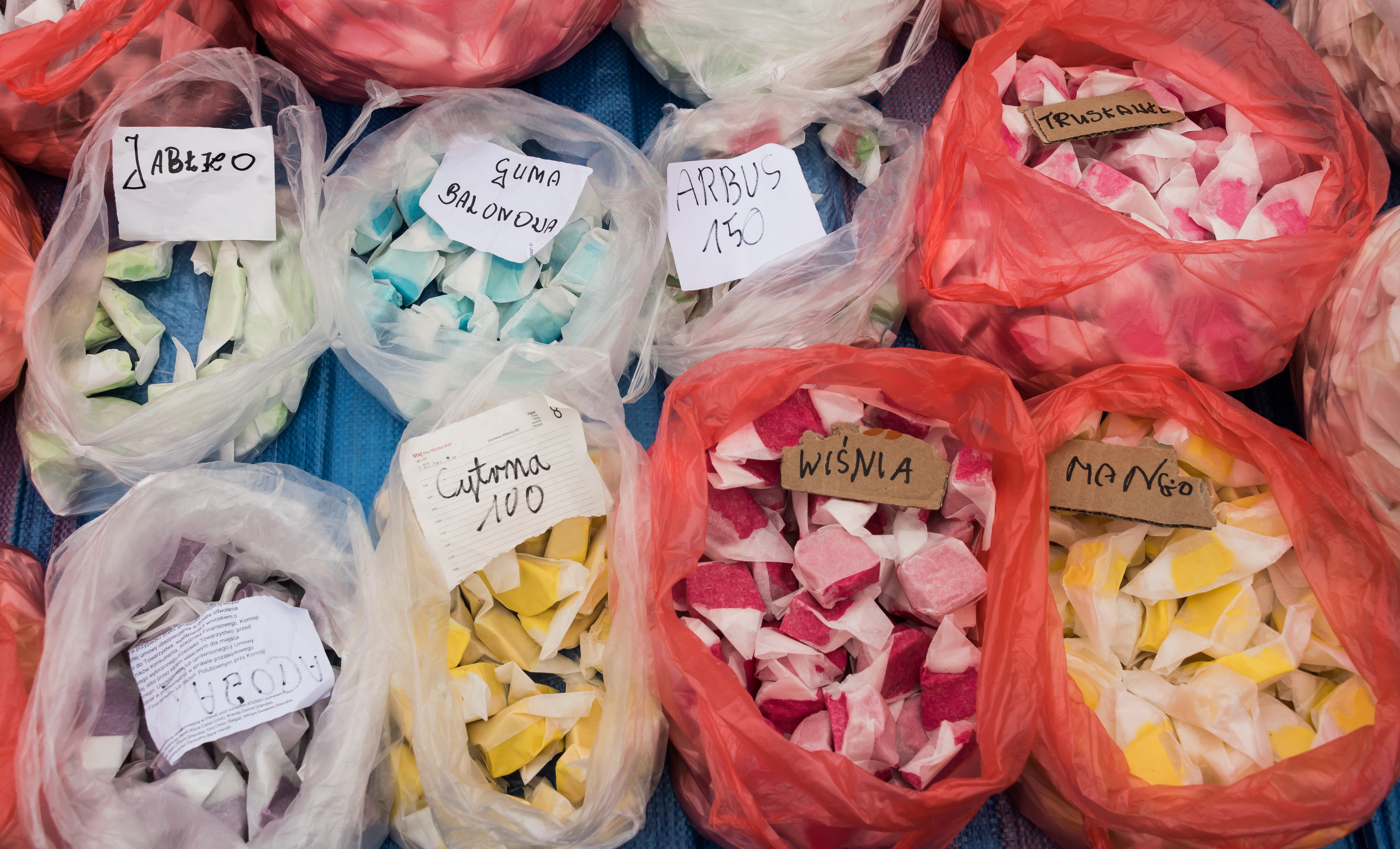
Pańska skórka in non-traditional flavors, such as (clockwise) strawberry, mango, cherry, lemon, blueberry, apple, bubble gum and watermelon.

The candy is sold at the capital's cemeteries on November 1, All Saints' Day. In 2008, it was entered on the list of traditional products in the Masovian Voivodeship. A comparable candy, known as trupi miodek (corpse honey), is sold in and around Kraków. The confectionery is usually made as a cottage industry product, and some Varsovians shun it as possibly cooked in unhygienic conditions.

Pańska skórka was called panieńska skórka (maiden's leather/skin) at the beginning of the 20th century, as featured in Słownik warszawski (Dictionary of Warsaw). The confectionery was then described as a "sweet mallow cake, sold in bars and pharmacies, as a cough remedy or as a delicacy" (1908 edition), while in the 1915 edition the candy seems to be "a pharmacy product, rather a delicacy than a medicine, given to coughing children, and composed of gum arabic, fine sugar, egg white, all beaten into foam, with orange flower oil, which forms quadrangular tablets, dried in moderate heat."
