= Racuchy =

Polish sweet dish

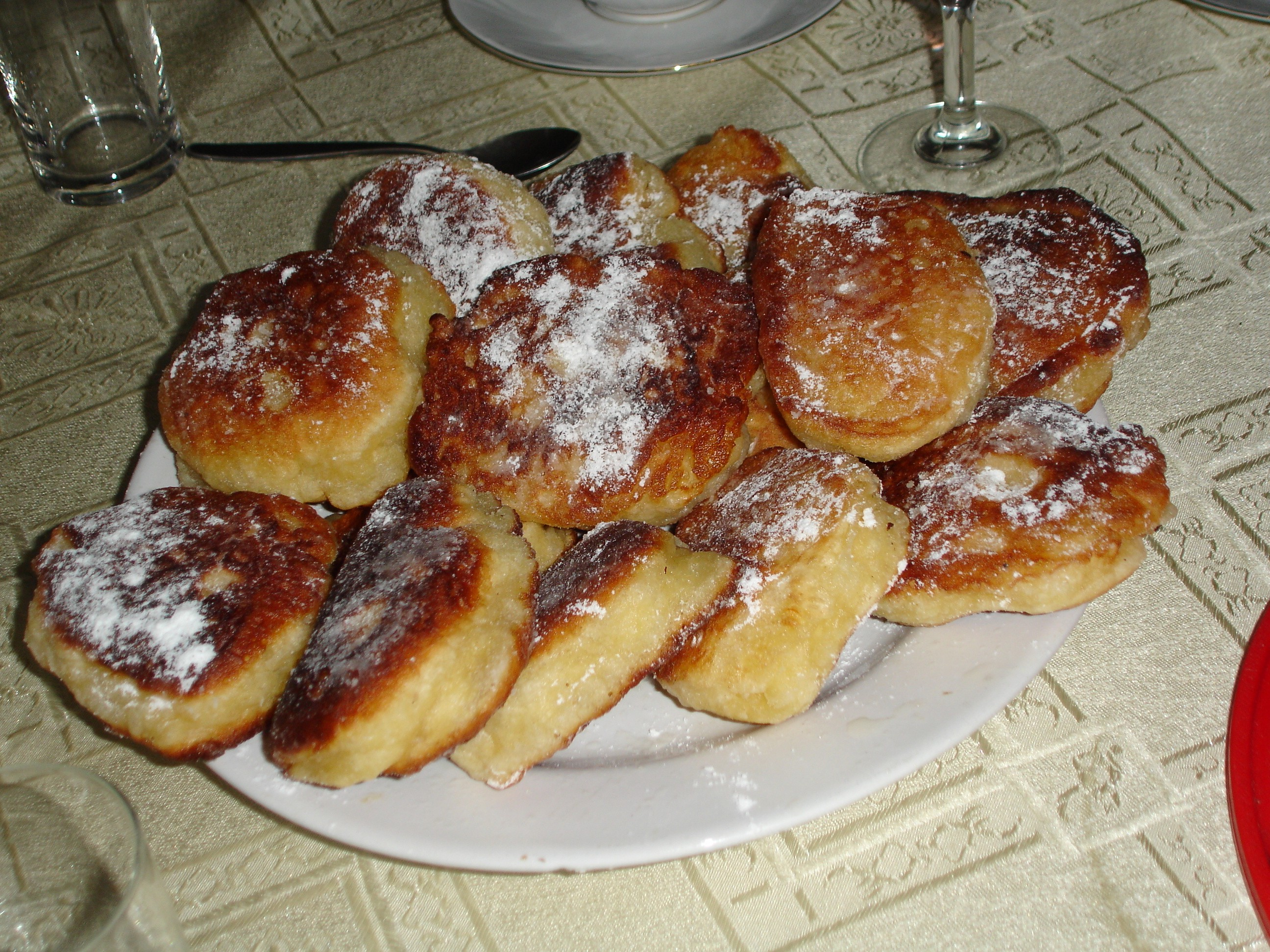
Racuchy topped with powdered sugar

Racuchy (pronounced Rah-tzoo-hih, Polish pronunciation: [raˈt͡suxɨ], singular: racuch) is a traditional Polish dish from the same family of foods as the crêpe and similar to American or Scottish pancakes. Racuchy are made from flour, milk, eggs, and sugar, with a pinch of salt. Racuchy are made with yeast other versions of Racuchy include, baking powder or baking soda. Racuchy are pan-fried in oil. In Poland, racuchy are usually eaten for dinner, a snack or supper.

Racuchy can be eaten plain, sprinkled with sugar, or topped with powdered sugar. In alternative versions cream or sour cream can be used.

In some regions, racuchy are prepared more savoury and served with fish soup or mushroom soup during the Christmas Eve dinner.

== Stuffed racuchy ==
The most popular version of racuchy is stuffed with slices of apple and served with sugar. Sometimes, in more modern versions, other fruits can be used, for instance, bananas. There is also a savoury sweet version of stuffed racuchy, filled with potatoes.

== See also ==
- Ruchanki
- List of stuffed dishes
