= Central European cuisine =

Overview of the cuisine of Central European

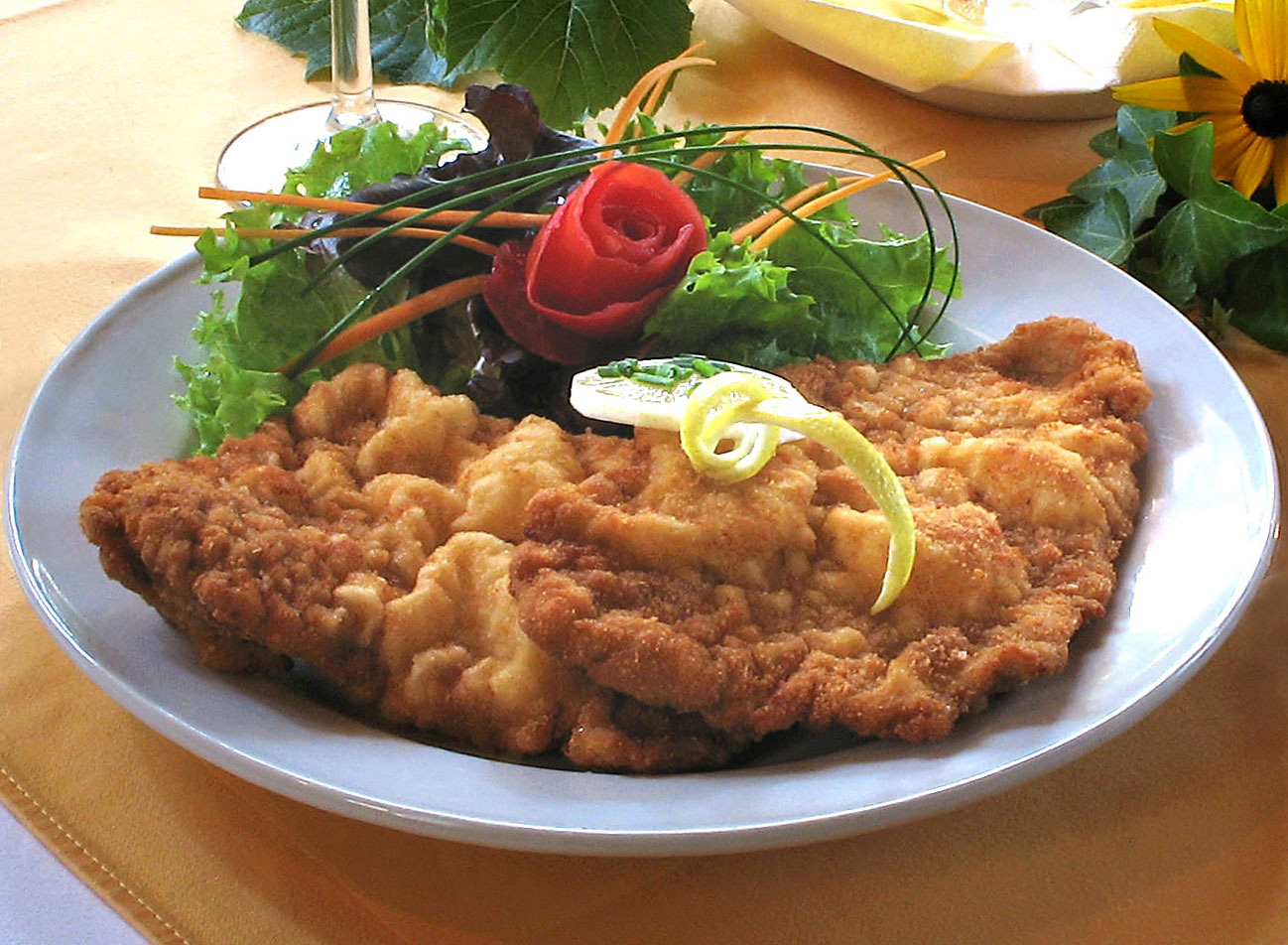
Austrian Wiener Schnitzel

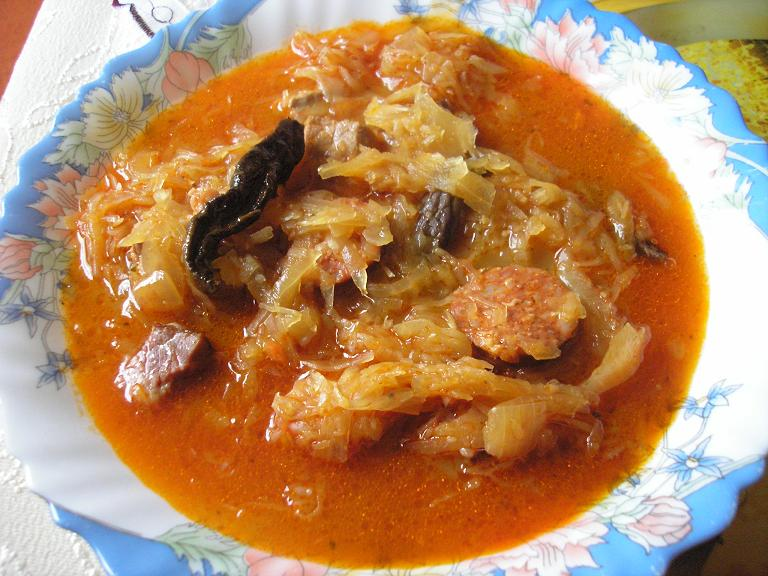
Slovak kapustnica (soup made from sauerkraut and sausage)

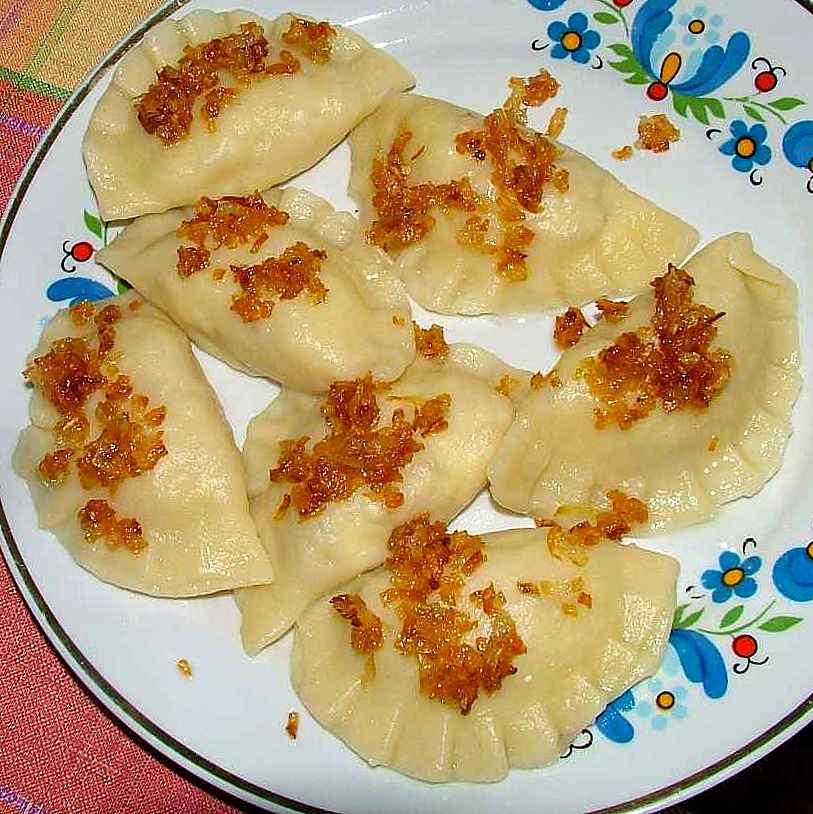
Polish Pierogi (filled dumplings with meat or cheese)

Central European cuisine consists of the culinary customs, traditions and cuisines of the nations of Central Europe.

The cuisines within each country in the region is strongly influenced by the local climate. For example, German, Austrian and Swiss cuisines show many similarities, yet differ from the highlander cuisines in their respective countries, while in settlements closer to rivers or lakes, more fish and various seafood can be found more frequently. More mountainous areas near the Alps house dishes that contain cheese, milk and butter among other dairy products.

While Croatia, Hungary, Lithuania, Poland, Slovakia and Slovenia are often geographically regarded as Central European, their cuisines are considerably dissimilar to the cuisines of Austria, Germany and Switzerland. Lithuanian, Polish and Slovak cuisine are often alternatively regarded as part of the eastern European culinary sphere due to ties with East Slavic cuisines. Croatian, Hungarian and Slovenian cuisine are often associated with Balkan cuisine, sharing significant gastronomic ties within the region.

During the Bronze Age and Iron Age the basic foods were pulses, wild fruits and nuts, and cereals. Archaeobotanical evidence has shown that a large number of new foodstuffs were introduced to Central Europe under Roman rule, becoming incorporated into (rather than replacing) local culinary flavors. Because chickpeas, gourd, black pepper, pistachio, almond, dates, olives, melons and rice were difficult to cultivate locally they remained imported luxuries, out of reach for most. Evidence has been found for dill, celery seeds and other seasonings at Bibracte and other excavation sites.

== See also ==
- Ashkenazi Jewish cuisine
- (Austria) Austrian cuisine
  - (Vienna) Viennese cuisine
- (Czech Republic) Czech cuisine
  - (Moravia) Moravian cuisine
- (Germany) German cuisine
  - Baden cuisine
  - (Bavaria) Bavarian cuisine
  - (Berlin) Berliner cuisine
  - Brandenburg cuisine
  - (Franconia) Franconian cuisine
  - Frisian cuisine
  - (Hamburg) Hamburger cuisine
  - (Hesse) Hessian cuisine
  - (Lower Saxony) Lower Saxon cuisine
  - Mecklenburg cuisine
  - Palatine cuisine
  - Pomeranian cuisine
  - (Saxony) Saxon cuisine
    - Ore Mountain cuisine
  - Schleswig-Holstein cuisine
  - Swabian cuisine
- (Hungary) Hungarian cuisine
- (Liechtenstein) Liechtensteiner cuisine
- (Poland) Polish cuisine
  - Lublin cuisine
  - (Opolskie Voivodeship) Opole cuisine
  - (Podlaskie Voivodeship) Podlaskie cuisine
  - (Świętokrzyskie Voivodeship) Świętokrzyskie cuisine
- (Silesia) Silesian cuisine
- (Slovakia) Slovak cuisine
- (Slovenia) Slovenian cuisine
- (Switzerland) Swiss cuisine
