= Lublin cuisine =

Culinary traditions of Lublin, Poland

Lublin cuisine includes all dishes with a specific regional identity belonging to the region of Lublin. It is a subtype of Polish and Galician cuisine with many similarities to and signs of the influence of neighbouring cuisines.

== List of Lublin dishes ==
=== Pastry and baked goods ===
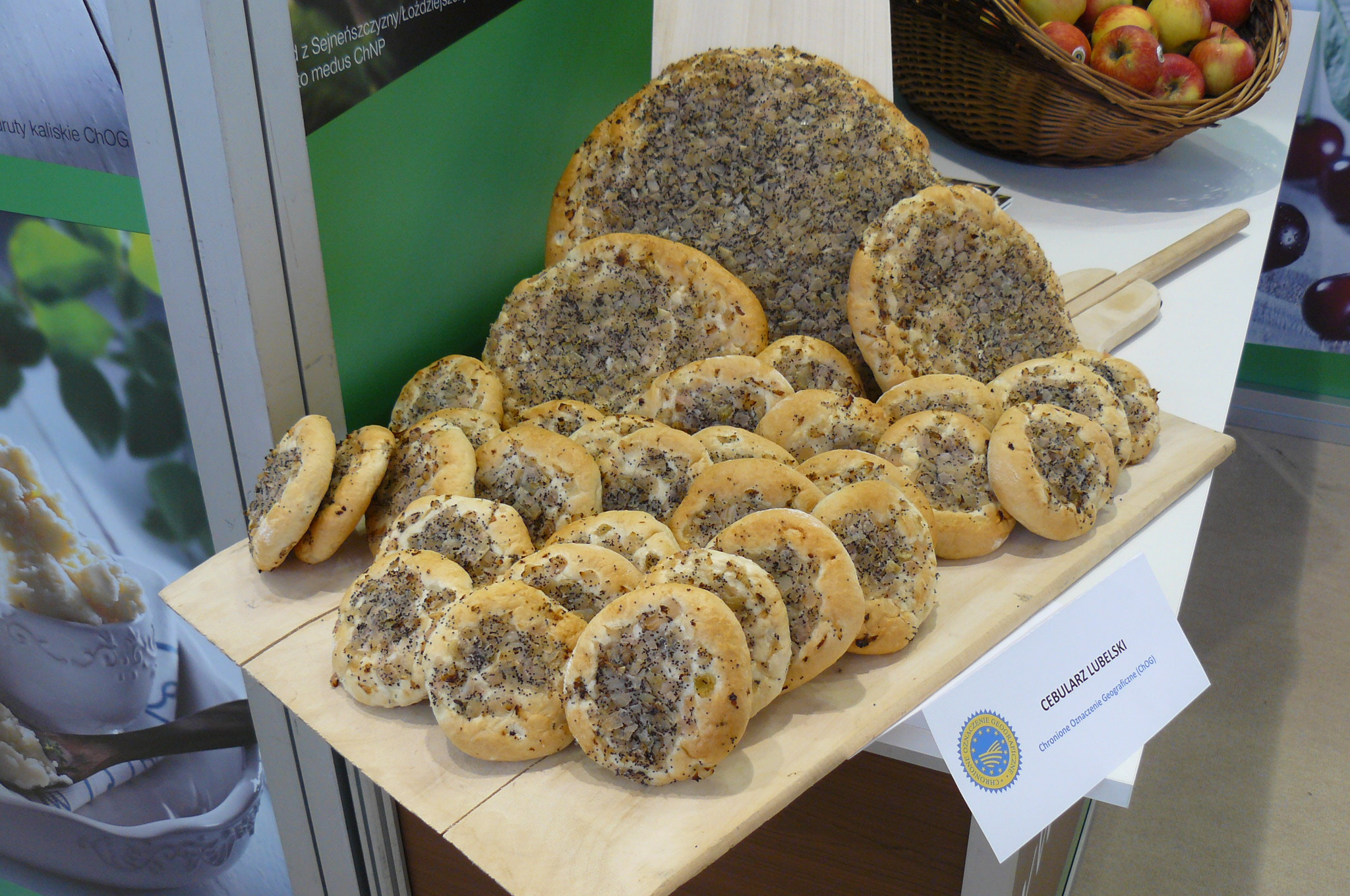
Cebularz lubelski

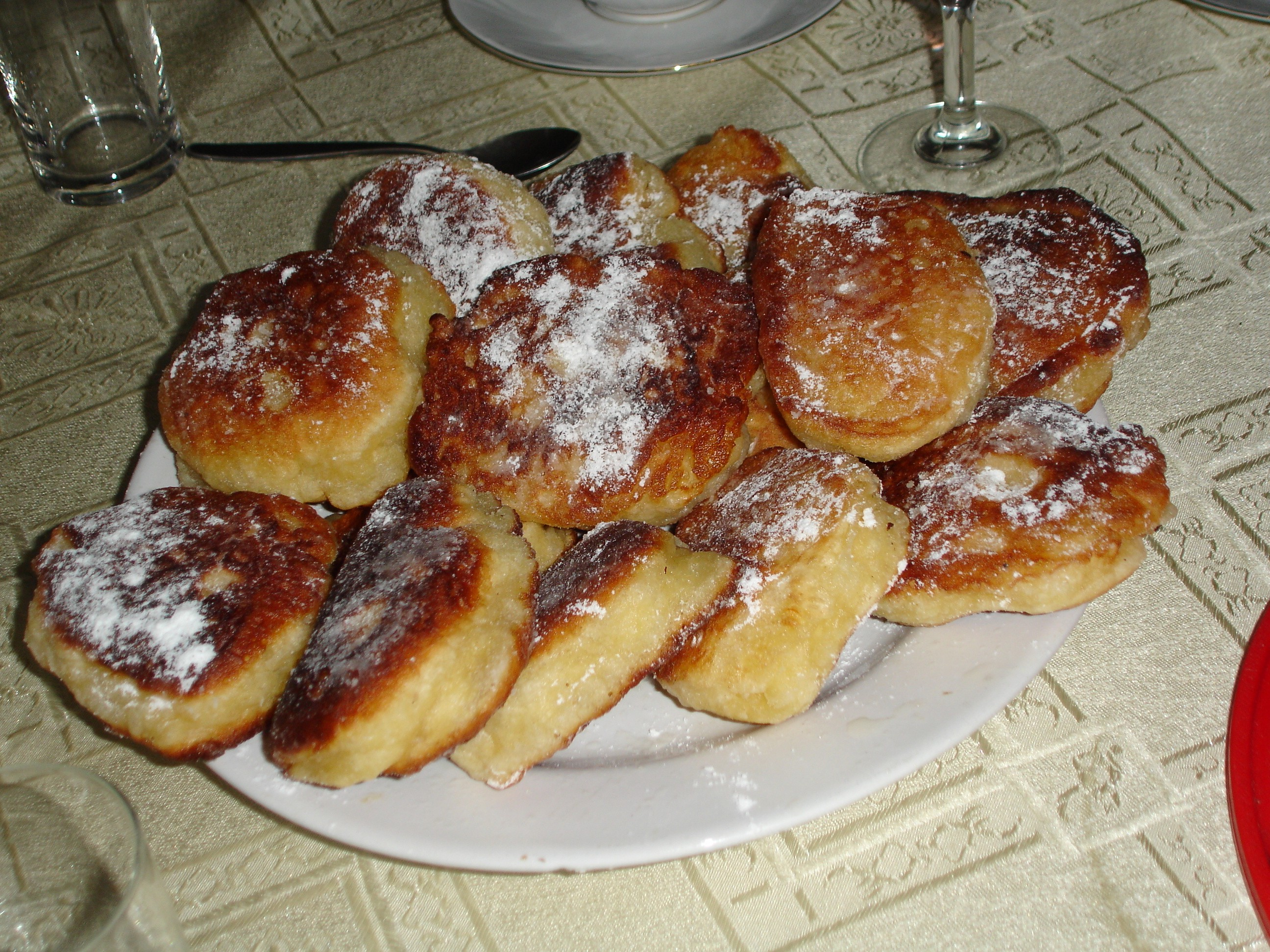
Racuchy turowskie

- Bułka wiejska – lightly salted bread roll
- Całuski pszczelowolskie – small, oval biscuits with honey and beeswax
- Cebulak żukowski – yeast dough with cheese-onion stuffing
- Cebularz lubelski – wheat flat-cake topped with onion and poppy seed
- Golasy izbickie – originating from Gmina Izbica; stuffed with buckwheat, boiled potatoes with cheese and śmietana
- Gryczak janowski – buckwheat grain with milk
- Gryczok godziszowski – grain with sugar, white cheese
- Korowaj – traditional wedding bread, served to the bride the day before marriage
- Paszteciki niedrzwickie z kapustą i pieczarkami – pasty with mushroom and cabbage
- Paszteciki z grzybami – mushroom pasty
- Pączki żakowolskie z powidłami z antonówek – originating from Żakowola; pączki with yeast dough and apple filling
- Piernik lubelski ("Lublin gingerbread") – two-layer sponge-fat cake, lightly sweet with an aromatic root smell
- Piernik żydowski ("Jewish gingerbread") – sponge-fat cake, topped with dried tropical fruit
- Pieróg biłgorajski, piróg biłgorajski ("Biłgoraj pierogi") – roast with kasza, potato, twaróg, eggs and śmietana
- Racuchy turowskie – oval, puffy yeast cake
- Racuchy z makiem (racuchy with poppy seed) – poppy seed-yeast cake
- Wafle tortowe suche ("dry cake waffles") – waffles; dry and crumbly, with a lightly sweet taste
- Zawijaki wygnanowskie – yeast dough "twist" with fruit

=== Soups ===
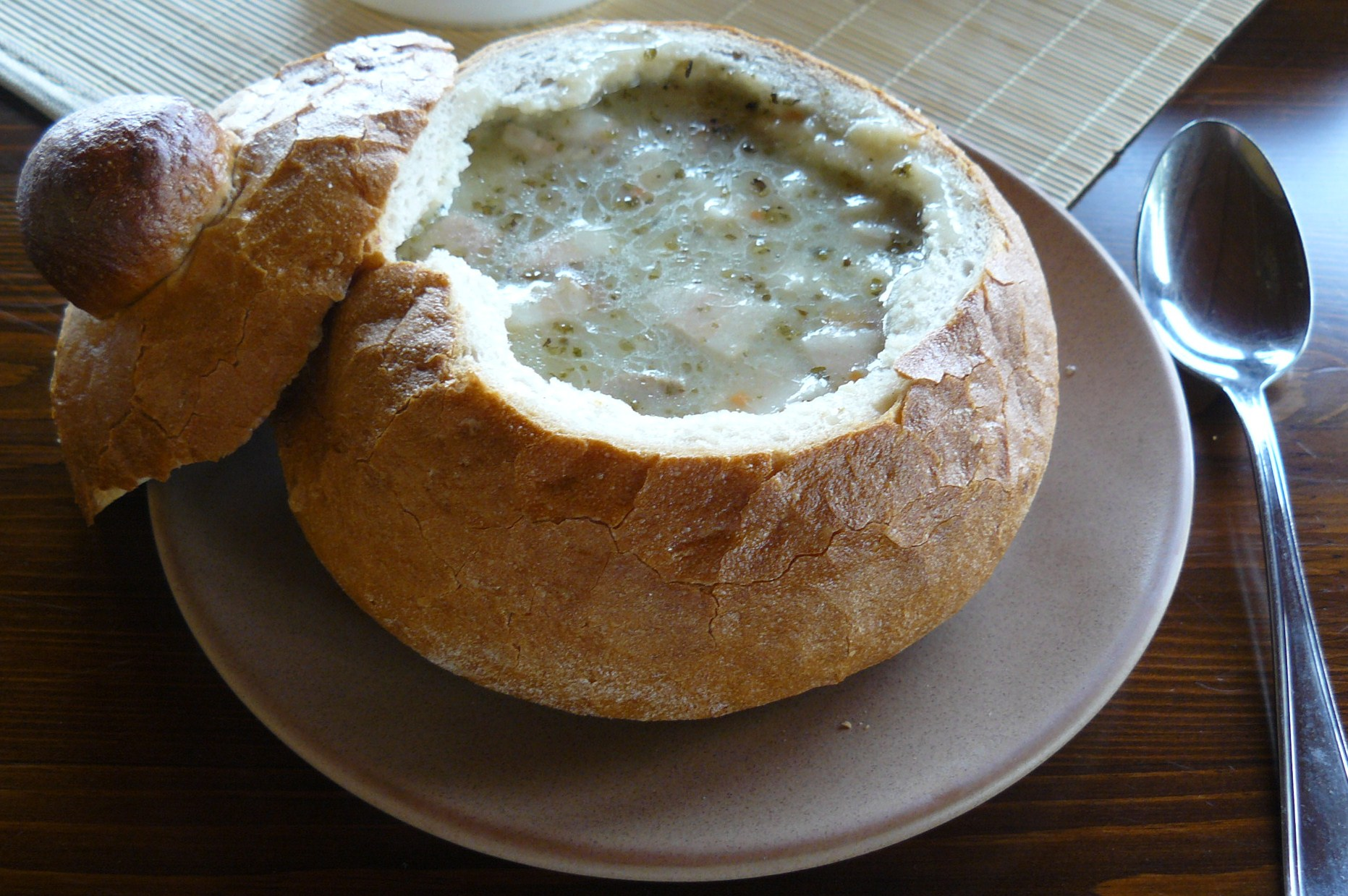
Żur żukowski

- Jabłczanka z fajsławic – dried apple soup with śmietana and sugar
- Zupa cebulowa z Goraja (Goraj onion soup) –
- Zupa chłopska fajsławicka – soup with potatoes, kluski, fatback and dewlap
- Zupa z karpia (carp soup) – soup with carp, vegetables, ginger and seasonings
- Żur żukowski – żurek with meat, onion and vegetables

=== Fish dishes ===
- Karasie z Polesia (Polesia crucian carp) – fish steak with onion–mushroom stuffing
- Karp w śmietanie po poniatowsku – originating from Poniatowa; carp with onion and sour cream
- Kotlety rybne z Sygrów (fish cutlet from Sygrów) – originating from Gmina Kodeń; cutlets from fresh fish (pike, tench, carp, or catfish) with garlic and seasoning

=== Pork and beef dishes ===
- Dzik w cieście – wild boar meat in bread cake
- Szynka nadwieprzańska – succulent, crumbly meat consistency
- Polędwica nadwieprzańska – dry, lightly moist meat
- Kaczka czarna nadziewana – duck with mince stuffing
- Kiełbasa nadwieprzańska – smoked pork kiełbasa

=== Stews, vegetable and potato dishes ===
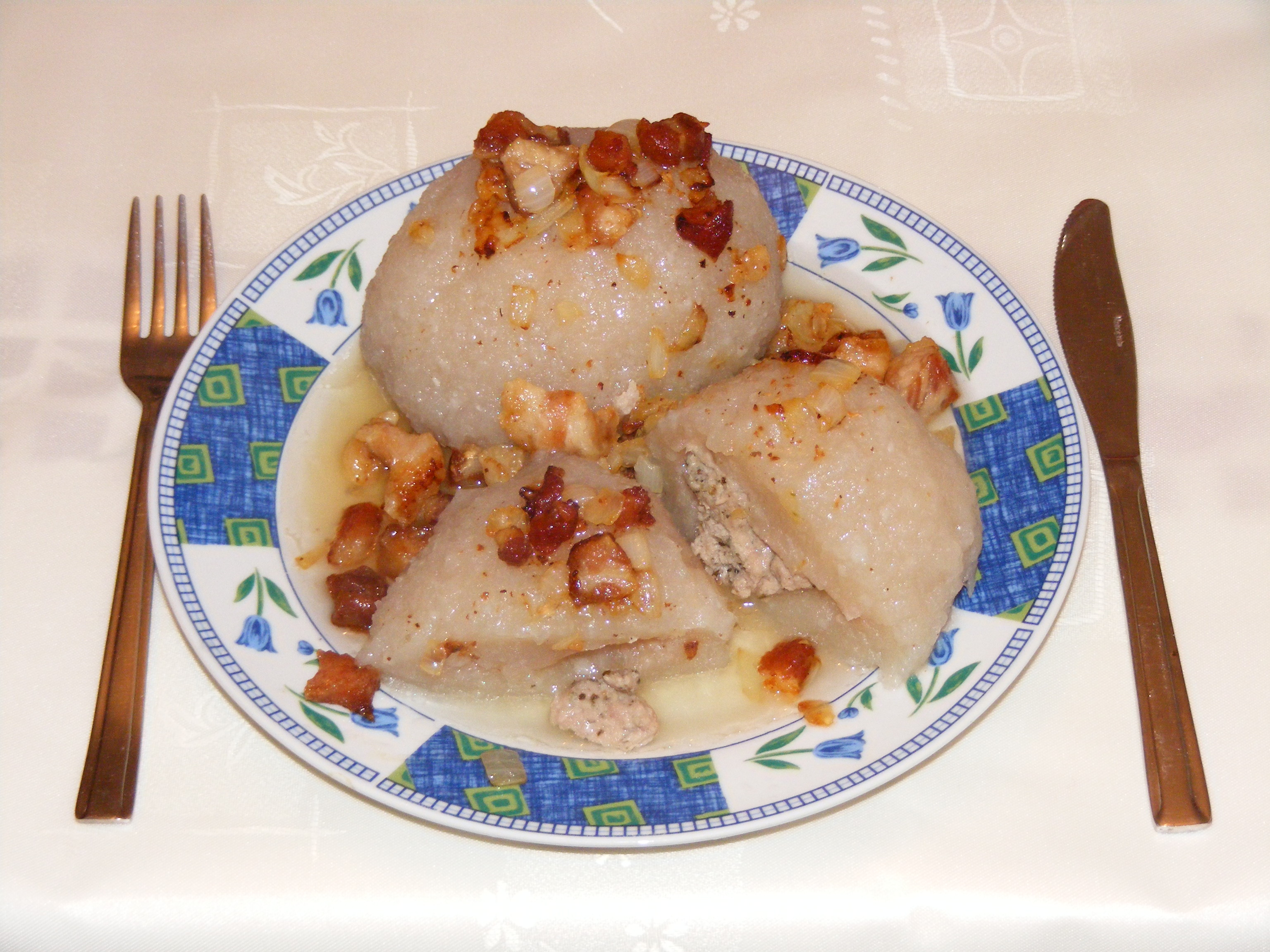
Pyzy polskowolskie

- Chodelskie gołąbki z kiszonej kapusty – gołąbki with sauerkraut and kasza, with rapeseed oil
- Flaki piaseckie – tripe with marjoram and cream
- Karczmiskie pierogi z bobru – pierogi with fava beans
- Kluski gryczane (groat kluski) – kasza kluski
- Kulebiak generałowej Kickiej – crescent-shaped roast with lightly spicy mushrooms
- Kulebiak z perkowic – yeast bake with meat-vegetable stuffing
- Lubelski forszmak – sweet and sour meat and sausage soup
- Parowańce brzozowickie (Brzozowica parowańce) – originating from the village Brzozowica Duża
- Parowańce z serem (parowańce with cheese) – pampuchy with cheese
- Parowańce z kaszą jaglaną (parowańce with millet) – pampuchy with millet
- Parowańce żakowolskie (Żakowola parowańce) – pampuchy with lentils
- Pierogi lipniackie (Lipniaki pierogi) – pierogi with cabbage and mushrooms
- Pierogi nowodworskie – pierogi with brown kasza, raisins and a small amount of mint
- Pierogi olszewnickie (Olszewnica pierogi)
- Pierogi turowskie z soczewicą (Turów pierogi with lentils)
- Pierogi zosinowskie (Zosinowo pierogi) – pierogi with buckwheat kasza
- Pierogi żakowolskie (Żakowola pierogi) – pierogi from yeast dough with apple stuffing
- Podcos – thick viand from cabbage, barley groats, dill and chives
- Pyzy polskowolskie (Polskowola pyzy) – pyzy with meat
- Słodkowska kapusta z grzybami – thick cabbage viand with mushrooms
- Tertuny brzozowickie – originating from the village Brzozowica Duża; kluski-like dish with potato and lentil stuffing
- Werbkowickie placki z soczewicy – flat, oval cakes with lentil stuffing
- Woleńskie kartoflaki – oval kluski with meat, topped with pork rind and roused with fat
- Zawijas nasutowski – "twist" with wheat dough and onion aroma
- Zawijoki janowickie – kluski-like dish with kasza and sauerkraut stuffing

=== Puddings ===
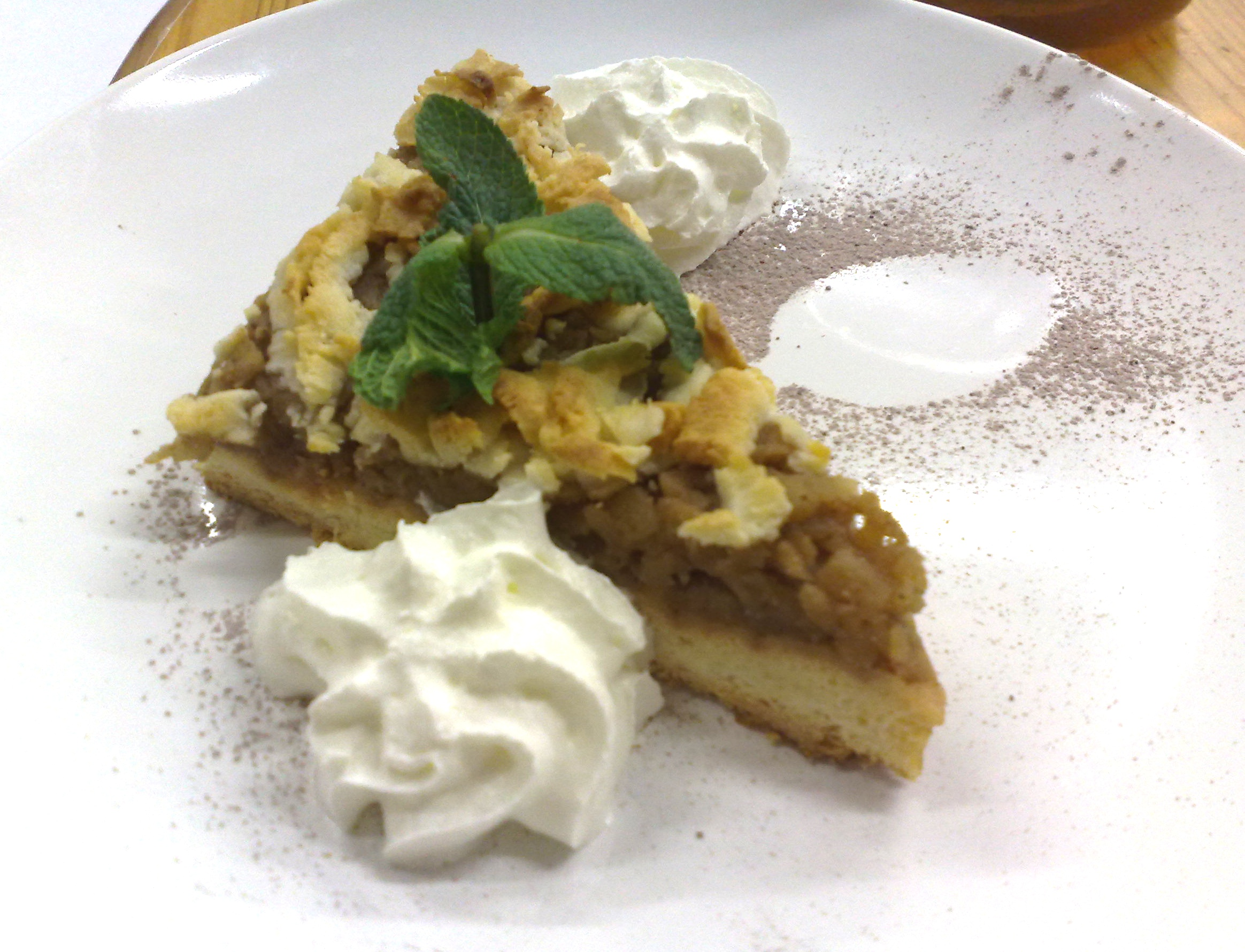
Szarlotka józefowska

- Baba drożdżowa z jabłkami (baba with apples) – yeast cake with apples
- Ciasto staropolskie podhoreckie (Old Polish Podhorce cake)
- Makowiec lubartowski (Lubartów poppy seed roll) – plum-nut makowiec
- Marchwiaki z makiem – carrot roulade with poppy seed
- Miodownik z Jaszczowka – honey cake
- Pieróg gryczany – kasza bake; sweet or savoury taste dependent on added ingredients
- Pralina z Lublina – raspberry-honey chocolate sweets
- Rudnicki pieróg jaglany – cake with honey and mint filling
- Sernik z kartoflami z Jaszczowa (Jaszczów potato cheesecake) – potato cheesecake
- Sękacz podlaski (Podlaskie sękacz) – pyramid cake, made of many layers; includes butter, egg whites, flour and cream
- Szarlotka józefowska (Józefów charlotte) – charlotte cake with apple filling

== See also ==
- List of Polish dishes
- Podlaskie cuisine
- Świętokrzyskie cuisine
