= Christmas carp =

Traditional fish dish in Central Europe

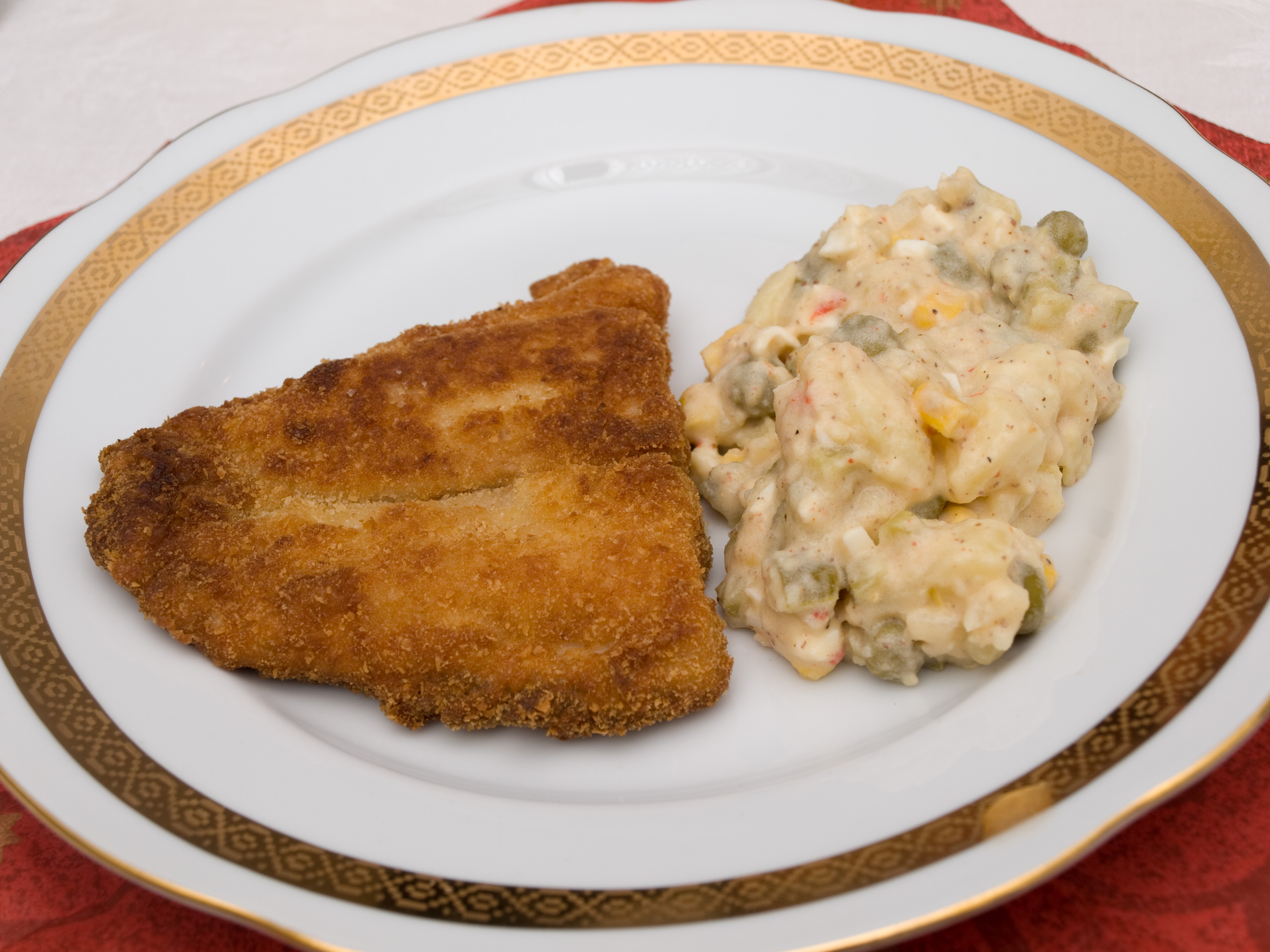
Breaded Christmas carp with potato salad

Christmas carp (German: Weihnachtskarpfen) is a traditional dish for Christmas Eve in Central Europe. The fish is traditionally kept in a bathtub before preparation to remove muddy flavours and is commonly fried or served in dishes like gefilte fish. In some regions, leftover bones are placed in fruit trees for spring growth and its scales are carried for good luck. Some beliefs link its head to Christ's torture instruments and protection against witches.

== Customs ==
The tradition of eating carp arose when, in accordance with Christian teachings, Advent was celebrated as a time of fasting. Fish is commonly eaten during fasting periods as it is not considered meat. Christmas carp became a special fasting dish to celebrate Christmas Eve as the high point of Advent and the eve of Christmas Day. In the Middle Ages, the carp (like the pike) was particularly religiously valued and was therefore often eaten at Christmas. According to the belief of the time, the fish's head was said to contain Christ's torture instruments, and the head bones were believed to form a dove-like bird figure that reminded people of the Holy Spirit and protected against witches. One old custom involves carrying around carp scales to bring a blessing of money in the new year. This custom probably stems from the coin-like shape of the carp's scales. In the culture and cuisine of the Ore Mountains, the carp is part of the Neinerlaa, a nine-piece ritual Christmas feast, with the carp symbolizing the abundance of money. An old Silesian custom is still followed today: the morning after the Christmas carp meal, the leftover fish bones are placed on the fruit trees in the garden to encourage them to flourish in the spring. This custom is also followed after eating the New Year's Eve carp. In the Czech Republic and Slovakia, the fish scales are considered a symbol of wealth and are placed under the plate or in the wallet.

== Preparation ==
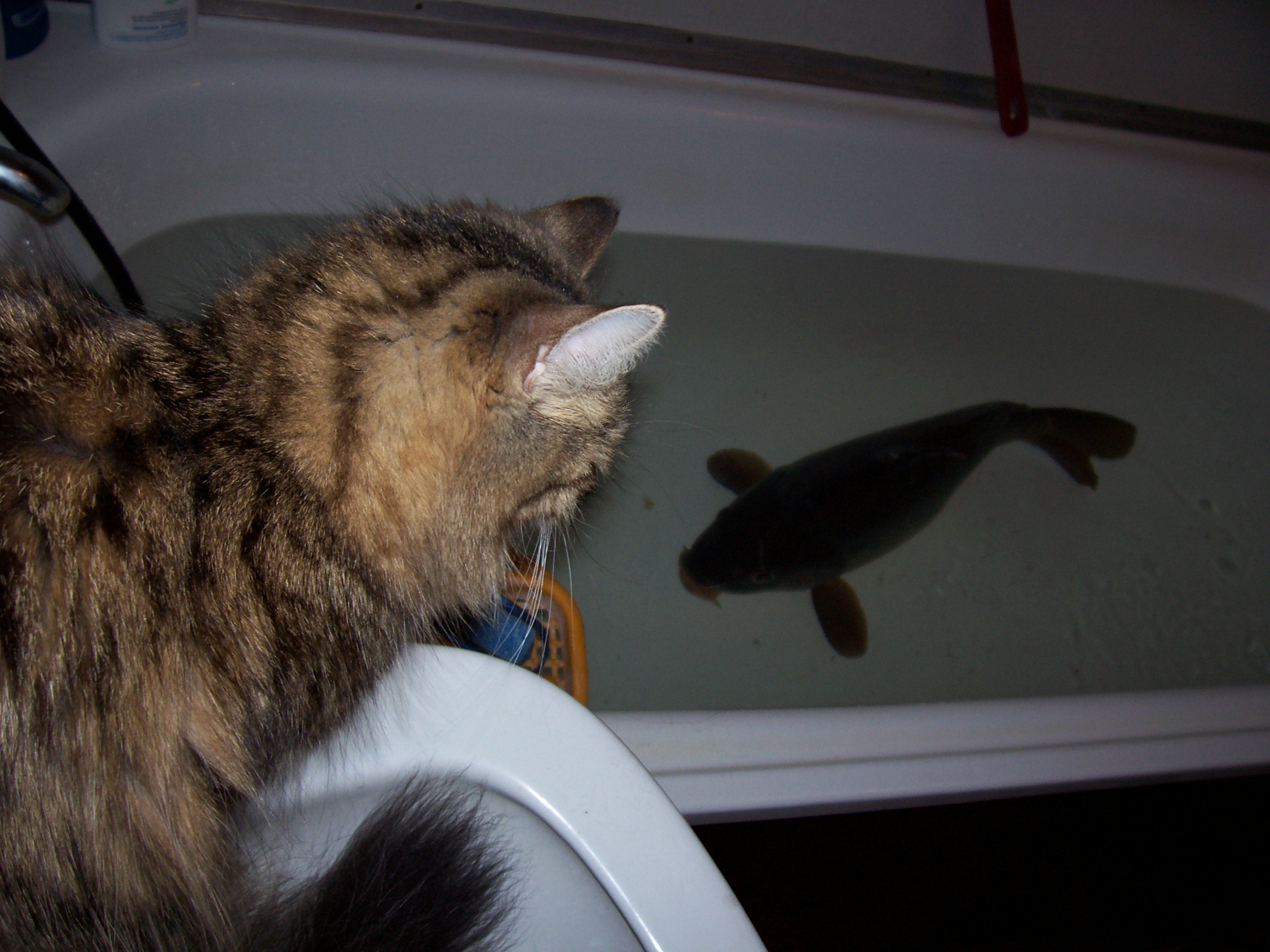
Carp in bathtub

The carp is traditionally taken home and kept for a few days in a bathtub. In the past, the carp was gutted the evening before at the latest and marinated in buttermilk overnight so that the strong taste was diluted. Before carp farming, when the fish were still caught from ponds, it was often the case that the carp swam in clear water in the bathtub for a few days. This had the effect of soaking the carp and thus removing the muddy taste that arises when the fish takes in food from the pond mud. By 2024, supermarkets in Poland, the Czech Republic and Slovakia had ended live carp sales.

In southern Germany, as well as in the Czech Republic, Austria (especially in the Waldviertel), Slovakia and Hungary, the Christmas carp is usually traditionally cut into pieces, breaded and fried in fat. The Christmas carp is served with potato salad (usually prepared with mayonnaise), cucumber salad, lemon wedges, boiled potatoes or remoulade. In northern regions, a popular preparation is blue carp with parsley or boiled potatoes and horseradish sauce. Another classic is stuffed carp. The fish is stuffed with various vegetables or potatoes. The whole carp is then roasted in the oven. In addition to the stuffing, other side dishes are usually fried tomatoes, mushrooms and boiled or fried potatoes. In Polish Catholic homes (more commonly in the northern regions near the Baltic Sea), gefilte fish (Polish: karp po żydowsku) is a traditional dish to be eaten on Christmas Eve (for twelve-dish supper) and Holy Saturday.

== See also ==
- List of Christmas dishes
- List of fish dishes
