= Hard fat =

Hard fat may refer to:

- Fatback, a specific cut of pork.
- Solid fat, such as fully hydrogenated vegetable oil.
