= Podlaskie cuisine =

Regional variety of cuisine in Poland, Belarus, and Lithuania

Podlaskie cuisine is an umbrella term for all dishes with a specific regional identity belonging to regions encompassed by the Podlaskie Voivodeship. It is a subtype of Polish cuisine with many similarities to and signs of the influence of neighbouring Lithuanian and Belarusian cuisines.

== List of Podlaskie dishes ==
=== Pastry and baked goods ===
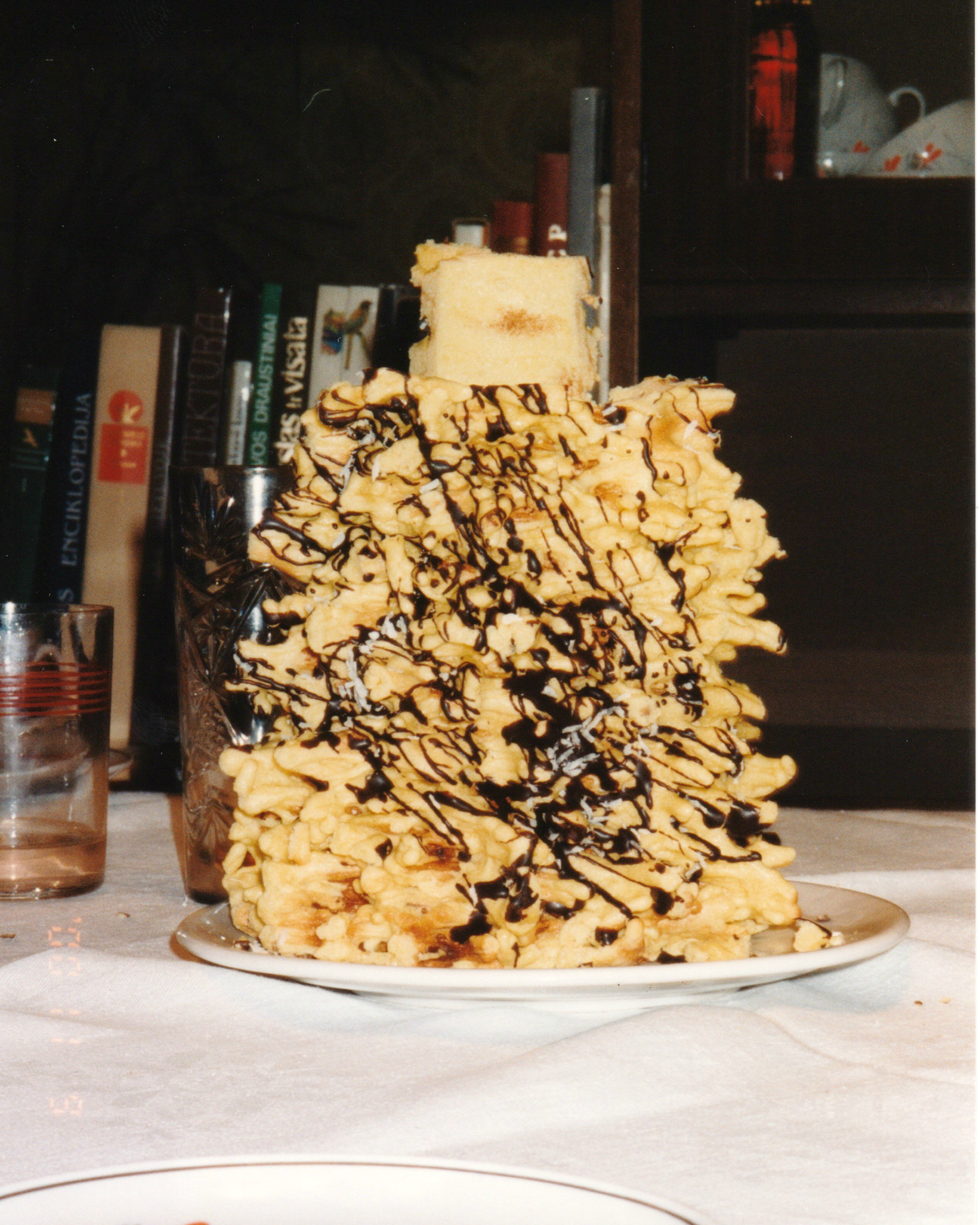
Sękacz sejneński

- Augustowska jagodzianka - bread rolls with berry filling, besprinkled with streusel
- Cebulniaczki - small bread rolls with onion stuffing
- Hajnowski marcinek - cake prepared from a layer of 30 pancakes, with butter cream between each layer
- Kreple - traditional doughnuts from East Prussia
- Makowiec z Ejszeryszek - light buttery, sour-tasting makowiec
- Mrowisko - faworki-shaped cake; pastry lightness dependent on eggs, natural honey
- Sękacz, bankuchen - pyramid cake, made of many layers; includes butter, egg whites, flour and cream; different variations exist around Podlaskie

=== Soups ===
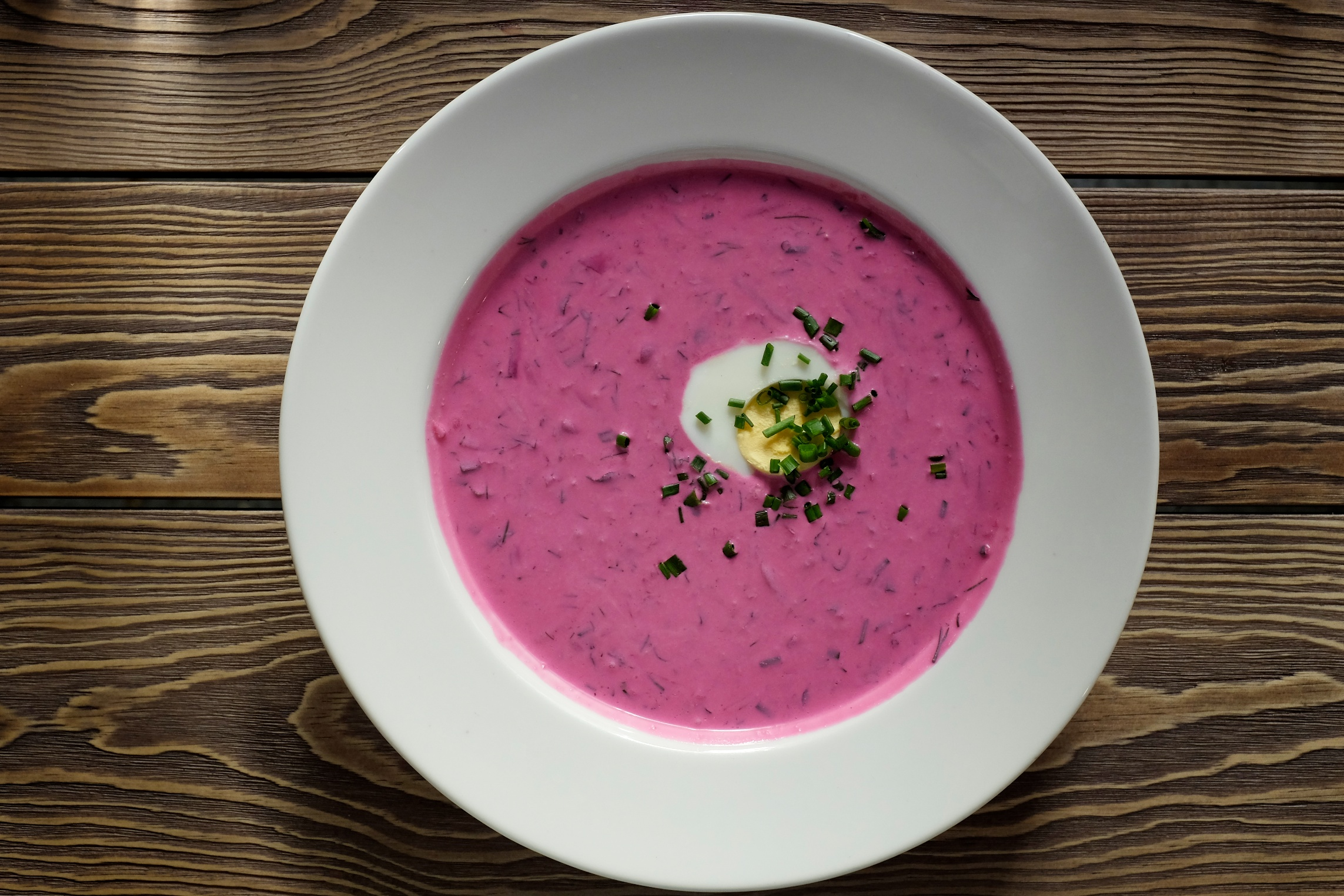
Chołodziec litewski

- Chołodziec litewski - cold soup made with soured milk, young beet leaves, beets, cucumbers and chopped fresh dill

=== Stews, vegetable and potato dishes ===
- Babka ziemniaczana - potato cake
- Bliny po litewsku - flat, oval potato pancakes with meat filling
- Cepeliny, kartacze sejneńskie - elongated, oval potato dumplings stuffed with meat and marjoram
- Kociołek cygański - thick-textured soup with chicken, pork, kiełbasa with added mushrooms and vegetables
- Kopytka - potato dumplings with fried onions
- Kołduny litewskie - a type of small pierogi, stuffed with meat, besprinkled with pork rind and onion
- Pieczeń wiedźmy - roast with pork ham, slices of fatback, onions and bay leaves
- Pierekaczewnik - an oval, curled pasty; taste dependent on filling
- Pierogi ruskie (Ruthenian pierogi) - quark cheese and potato dumplings
- Pierogi wigierskie - crescent-shaped pierogi with fruit stuffing
- Tort ziemniaczany - roast with Krakowska kiełbasa, cheese and onion

=== Fish dishes ===
- Okoń smażony - perch fried in butter

=== Pork and beef dishes ===
- Kiszka ziemniaczana - kaszanka with pork, bacon or fatback

== Puddings ==
- Melszpejz zaparzany z jabłek - cake based on butter, apples and bread crumbs

== See also ==
- List of Polish dishes
- Lublin cuisine
- Pomeranian cuisine
- Świętokrzyskie cuisine
