= Mecklenburg cuisine =

German region cuisine

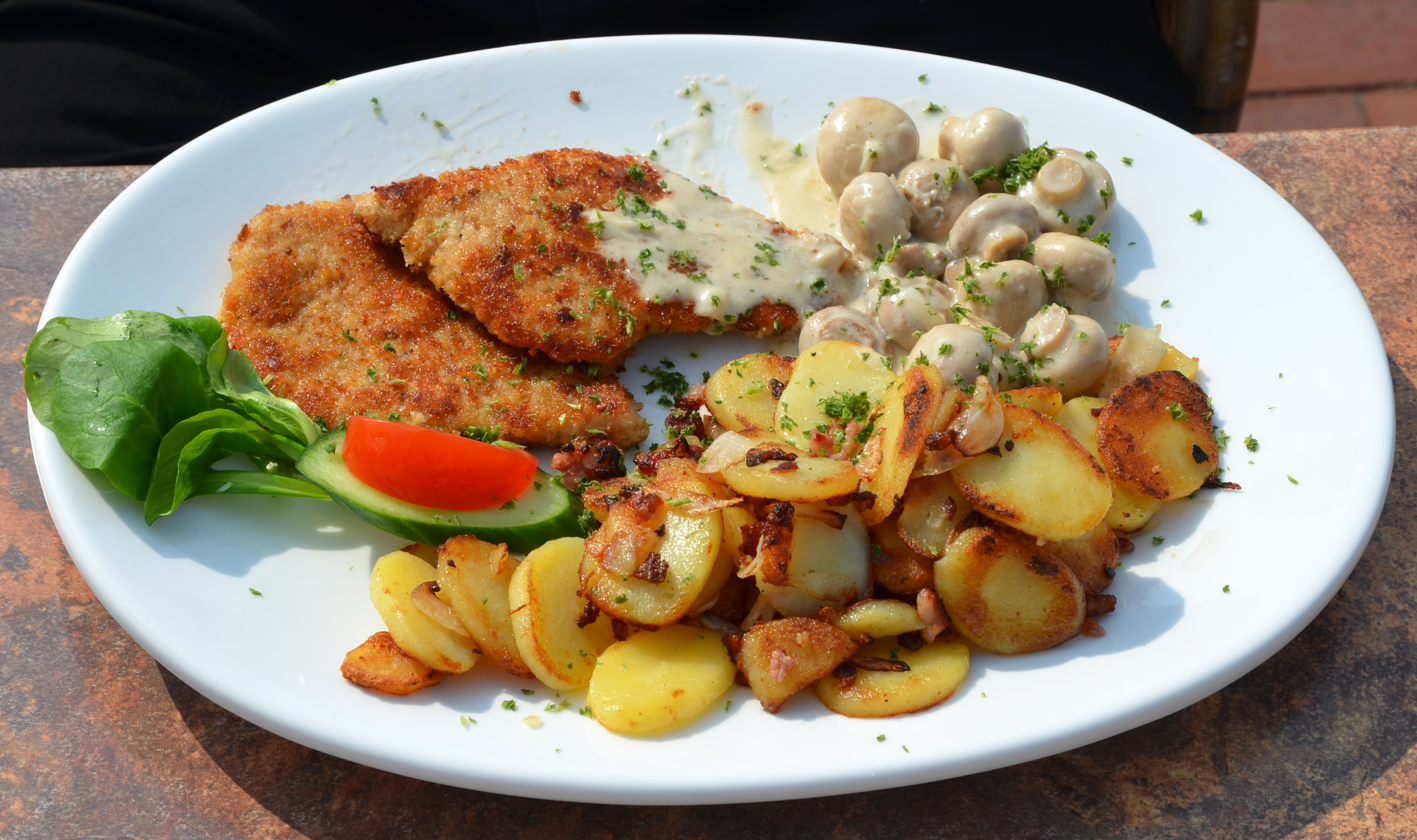
Example of a dish from Mecklenburg

Mecklenburg cuisine is typically northeast German. Many dishes in the region today, whilst retaining their original characteristics, frequently add new facets, whilst old dishes are being rediscovered and combined with current recipes.

Mecklenburg food has traditionally been considered as rather down-to-earth and hearty. It reflects, on the one hand, the simple life of the region of Mecklenburg, long dominated by agriculture, and on the other hand, its long Baltic coastline and the abundance of its inland waters. In addition, its vast forests produce a wealth of game. Potatoes, known locally as Tüften, play a particularly important role in the region also, as evinced by the existence of a potato museum (the Vorpommersches Kartoffelmuseum) in neighbouring West Pomerania, and a variety of cooking methods are used to prepare them. Other staples are kale, known as Grünkohl and a sweet-and-sour flavour produced, for example, by using dried fruit. Although Mecklenburg and Western Pomerania have both had long, independent histories, the similarity in living conditions and landscapes in both regions has resulted in both populations having similar eating habits.

Carl Julius Weber reported in the 18th century on the eating habits of the Mecklenburgers:

"The people live mainly off potatoes, dried fruit, white cabbage, turnips and broad beans." ("Das Volk lebt meist von Kartoffeln, von dürrem Obst, von Weißkraut, Rüben und Pferdebohnen")

.

== Specialities ==
=== Fish ===
- Gebratener Räucheraal or Gebackener Spickaal (baked, smoked eel)
- Gebratene Maischolle or Braden Maischull

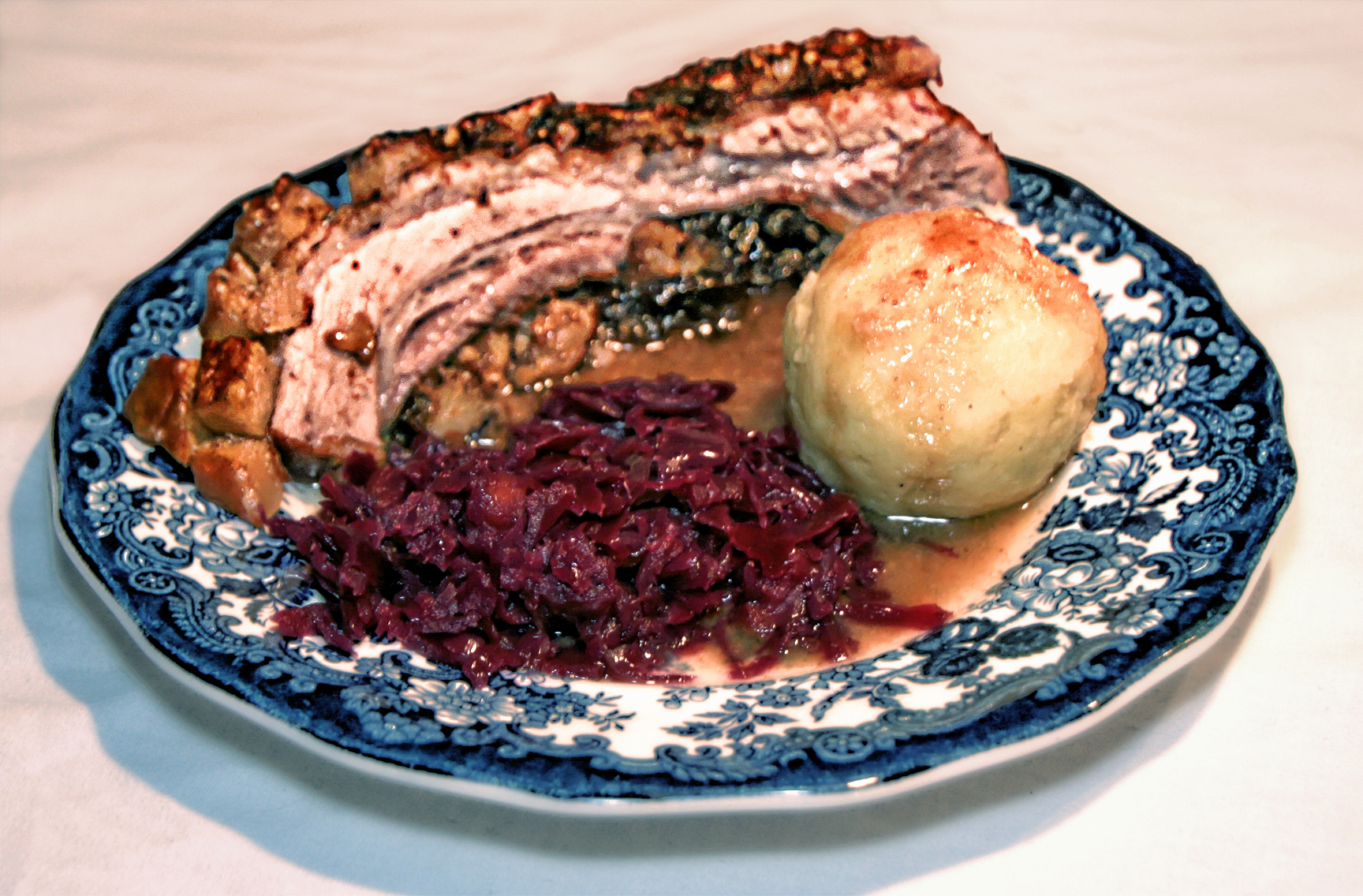
Mecklenburg roast ribs

=== Pork and beef ===
- Kloppschinken
- Topfleberwurst
- Mecklenburg roast ribs (Mecklenburger Rippenbraten)

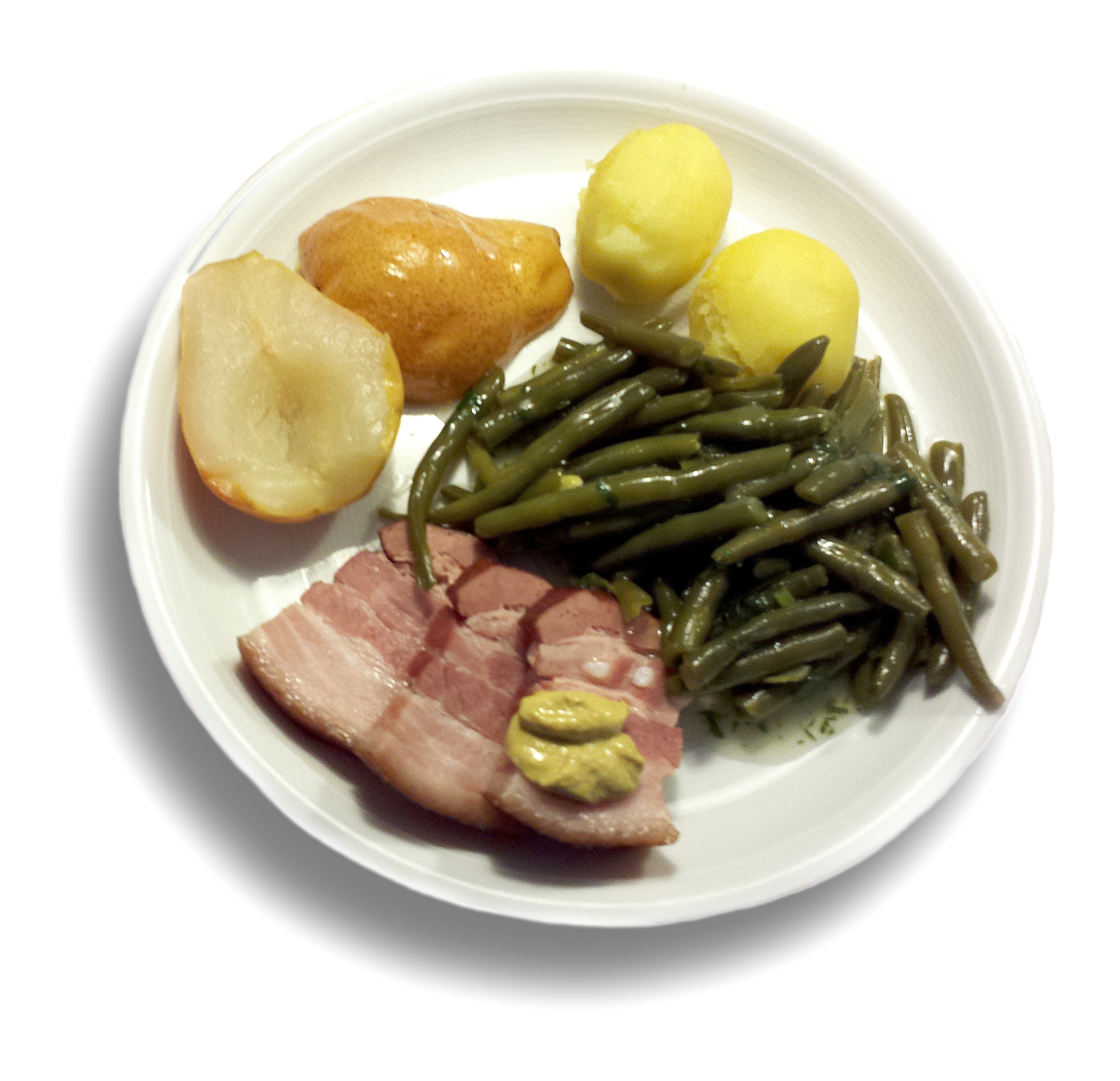
Birnen, Bohnen und Speck

=== Stews, vegetable and potatoes ===
- Tüffel un Plum (potato soup with plums and bacon)
- Fliederbeersuppe
- Schwemmklöße
- Buttermilchkartoffeln
- Birnen, Bohnen und Speck

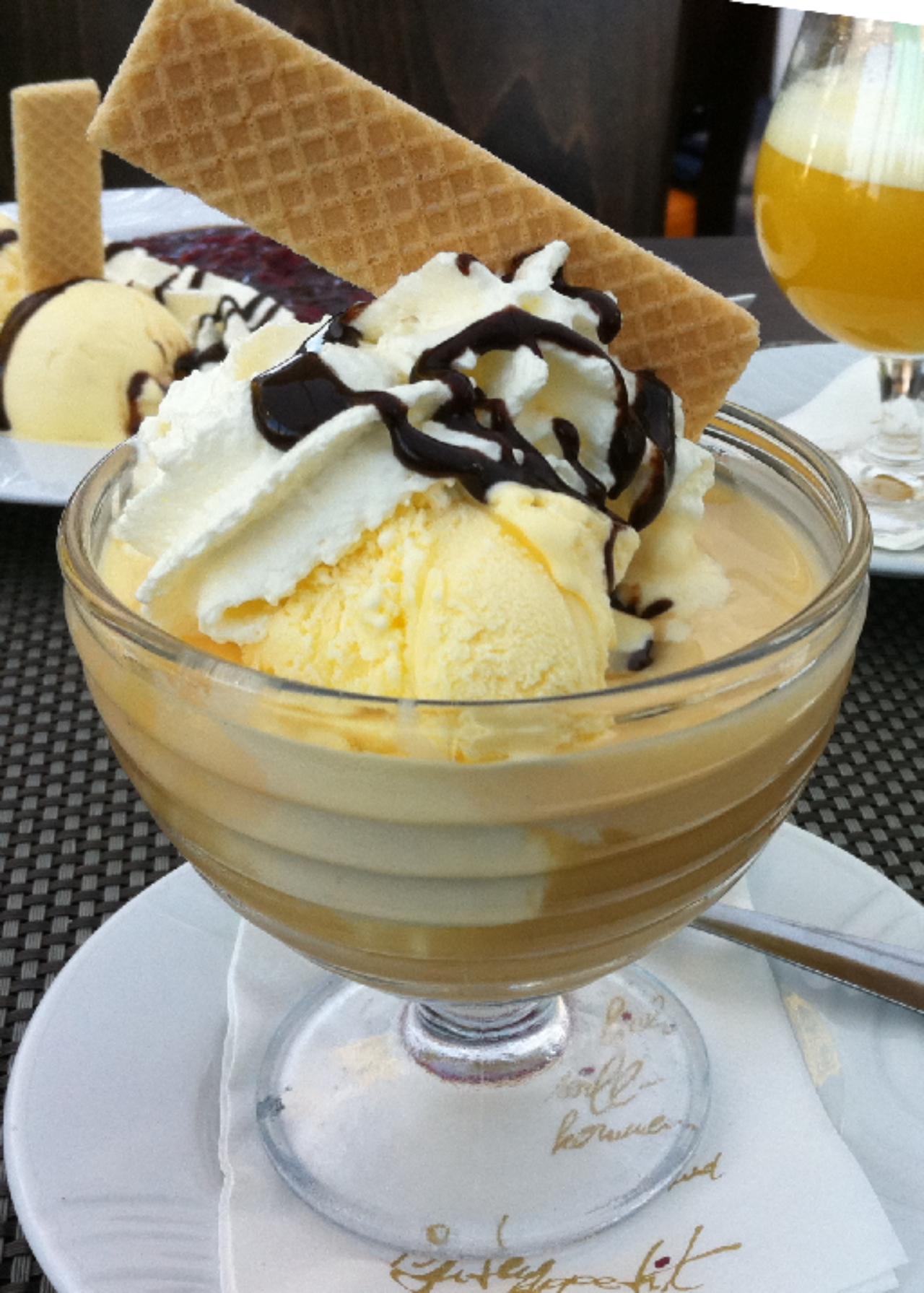
Schwedeneisbecher, a popular ice cream variant in Mecklenburg.

=== Puddings ===
- Sanddorntorte
- Black bread pudding (Schwarzbrotpudding)
- Rote Grütze
- Mandelkringel
- Sour cream pudding (Schmandpudding)
- Arme Ritter
- Mecklenburg Götterspeise (Mecklenburgische Götterspeise)
- Swedish ice cream sundae (Schwedeneisbecher)

=== Christmas dishes ===
- Honigkuchen auf dem Blech
- White Pfeffernüsse (Weiße Pfeffernüsse)

=== Drink ===
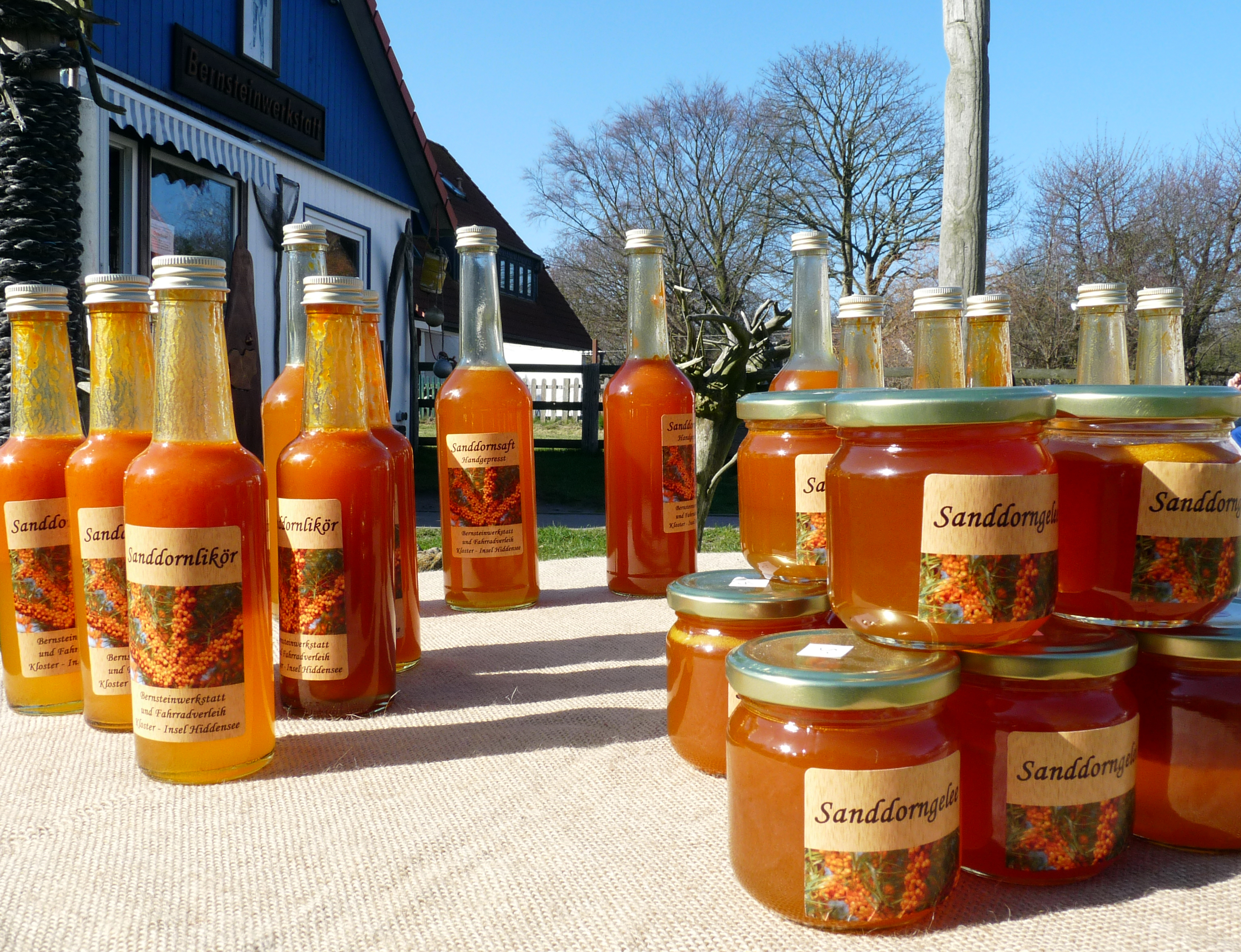
Sanddorn berries are used in Mecklenburg in a variety of products, including spirits, juice and jams

- Grog
- Mecklenburg country wine (Landwein) from the Stargarder Land
- Sanddorn: sanddorn wine, sanddorn spirit, and sanddorn fruit juice

==== Beers ====
- Darguner Pilsener, Dunkelbier, Stierbier, Mecklenburger Pilsener, Schloss Hefeweizen, etc., from the Darguner Brauerei
- Rostocker Pilsener, Bockbier, Dunkelbier, etc., from the Hanseatische Brauerei Rostock
- Lübzer Pils, Bock, Export, Schwarzbier, Urkraft, Nordbräu Pilsner and Duckstein from the Mecklenburgische Brauerei Lübz

== Gourmet food ==
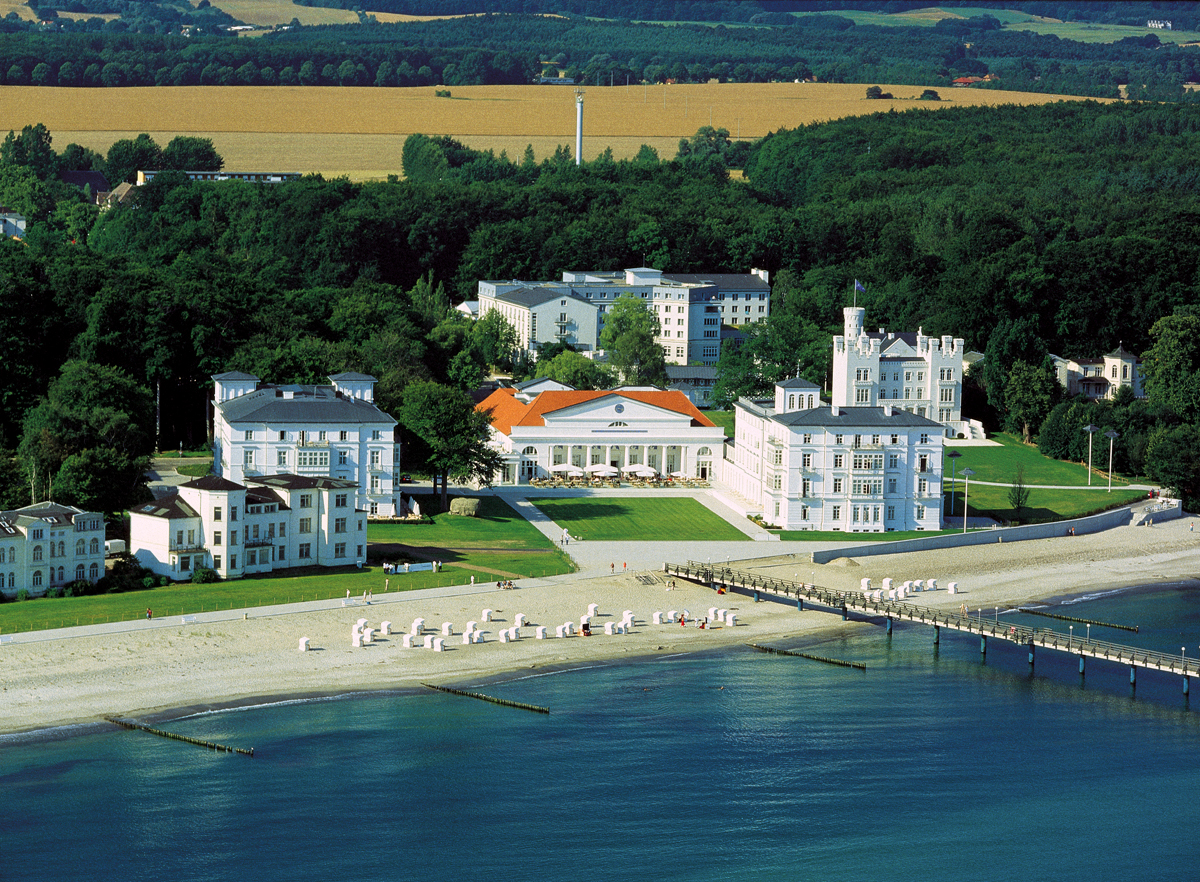
The Grand Hotel Heiligendamm is home to the most decorated gourmet restaurant in Northern Germany, the "Friedrich Franz"

Several leading restaurants in Mecklenburg have been given awards for excellence this century.

Amongst the starred restaurants listed in the 2015 Michelin Guide are the Ostseelounge im Strandhotel Fischland in Dierhagen, the Gourmet-Restaurant Friedrich Franz in Heiligendamm, the Alte Schule Fürstenhagen in the Feldberg Lake District, the Ich weiß ein Haus am See restaurant in Krakow am See and Der Butt in Rostock.

The 2015 edition of the Gault-Millau culinary guide lists the Gourmet-Restaurant Friedrich Franz, headed by chef Ronny Siewert, in Heiligendamm as their top gourmet restaurant with 18 points out of 20. In second place, each with 16 points are chefs, Daniel Schmidthaler from the Alten Schule Fürstenhagen (Feldberg Lake District), Matthias Stolze from Der Butt restaurant (Rostock-Warnemünde) and Pierre Nippkow of the Ostseelounge (Dierhagen). On 15 points are Alexander Ramm from the Jagdhaus Heiligendamm and Raik Zeigner of Ich weiß ein Haus am See (Krakow am See). Other leading restaurant guides, like the Varta-Führer, the Bertelsmann Guide, Der Feinschmecker and the Schlemmer Atlas assess that gourmet restaurants in Mecklenburg are of high quality.

== Literature ==
- Frieda Ritzerow: Mecklenburgisches Kochbuch. Fifth edition, Martin, Jack, 1990 (unabridged replica of the 1868 edition).

== See also ==
- Pomeranian cuisine
