= Pletzel =

Type of Jewish flatbread

- Type: Cracker or flatbread
- Region or state: United States
- Created by: Ashkenazi Jews

Pletzel, platzel or pletzl (Yiddish: פלעצל), also known as onion board or onion flat, is a type of Jewish flatbread or flat roll similar to focaccia.

== Overview ==
In Białystok, Poland, where the pletzel likely originated, it was known as Bialystoken tzibele pletzel kuchen in German, or "Bialystock onion pletzel cakes" in Yiddish. They are related to the bialy, but larger, sweeter, thinner, harder, and flatter. In Eastern Europe, they were sold as a street food from pushcarts. They are also called flam pletzel or "flame cakes." In Yiddish and Germanic languages, pletzel literally refers to a small town square, perhaps inspiring the name for the square of dough with onions and poppy seeds imaginatively invoking a plaza. Pletzels became common within the Lower East Side Jewish community in New York City, where they became a staple food alongside bagels and bialys. They could also be found in the Jewish East End of London.

Baked with onions and poppy seeds, they may also be served with goose fat or schmaltz, pot cheese, butter, chopped liver, egg salad, or cream cheese, as a spread (schmear). They also can be served with meats or soup. Pletzlach were commonly sold in American Jewish bakeries and Jewish dairy restaurants until the end of the 20th century, and have become considerably rarer, but can still be found. The pletzel may be obtained at Jewish bakeries such as Kossar's Bialys of the Lower East Side, or Zabar's.

== See also ==
- Cebularz
- List of Jewish cuisine dishes
