= Seattle-style hot dog =

Hot dog served in a bun slathered with cream cheese

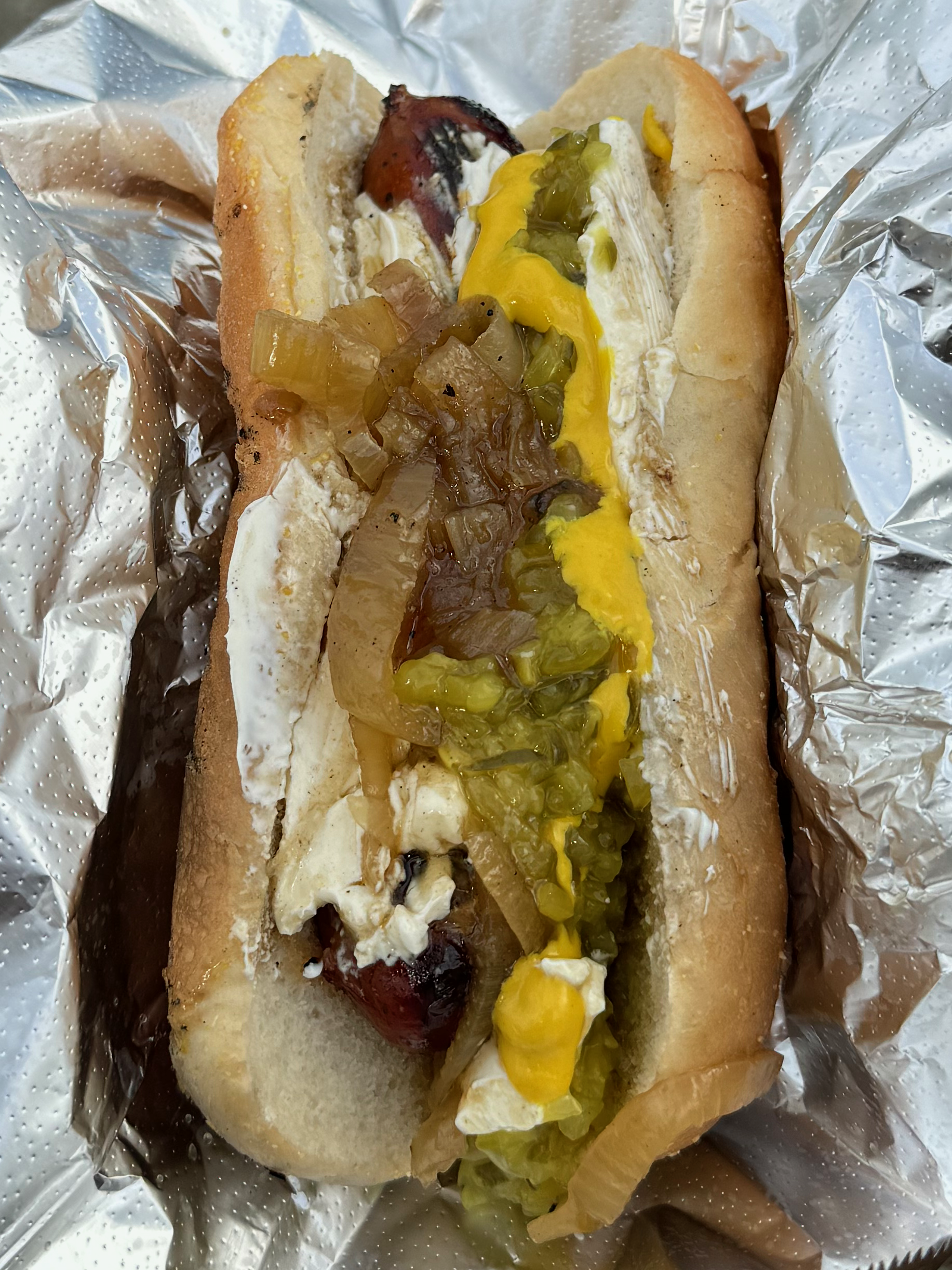
- A Seattle-style hot dog
- Alternative names: Seattle dog; Bagel dog
- Type: Hot dog
- Place of origin: United States
- Region or state: Seattle
- Associated cuisine: Street food
- Created by: Hadley Long; Hadley's Bagel Dogs
- Invented: 1989
- Main ingredients: Hot dog, cream cheese, sautéed onions, bun (originally a bialy roll)
- Variations: sliced jalapenos

A Seattle-style hot dog, locally referred to as a Seattle Dog, is a hot dog served in a bun slathered with cream cheese and topped with caramelized onions and sometimes jalapeños. In Seattle, the dogs are sold from food carts, especially outside stadiums on game day and as a late-night meal outside the city's music venues.

== History ==
The Seattle-style hot dog was invented in 1989 in the Pioneer Square neighborhood by Hadley Long, a vegetarian food vendor from Ohio, who operated a bagel cart on the sidewalk between the Central Saloon and J&M Cafe and Cardroom. Long originally served only vegetarian bagels and toppings from his cart, but soon gave in to late-night demand for meat by adding hot dogs to his existing bagels and cream cheese. He sourced bialy-style buns from the Bagel Deli on Capitol Hill and spread both sides with cream cheese before adding a hot dog, naming his new recipe and cart Hadley's Bagel Dogs.

Seattle Dogs increased in popularity at bars and music venues during the grunge movement of the 1990s. In 1999, The Stranger favorably reviewed the hot dog stand outside The Showbox, seemingly the first mention of cream cheese hot dogs by local media.

Seattle-style hot dogs are now often sold at bars and their surrounding street vendors at night. They are also available at and near the city's sporting venues. A vendor told Seattle Weekly that he believed large crowds visiting stands outside of Safeco Field (now T-Mobile Park) during the Seattle Mariners 2001 116–46 season was "the big boom" for the recipe.

In Everett, a cart began selling Seattle-style dogs outside Angel of the Winds Arena in 2009. The Seattle Mariners began serving Seattle Dogs at the Hit it Here Café inside T-Mobile Park during the 2010 season.

James Beard Award-winning Seattle chef Renee Erickson features an $18 hot dog on the menu of the Deep Dive bar at the Amazon Spheres. The gourmet take on the Seattle Dog is dressed with whipped cream cheese, pickled jalapeños, pickled red onions, and pink salmon roe caviar.

== Preparation ==
The sausage is cut butterfly style then grilled and served on either a hoagie roll or bun, usually toasted.

A key component of what defines a Seattle-style hot dog is the use of the cream cheese. Since the creation, vendors debated on what additional topping goes on a Seattle Dog, but a common consensus is that cream cheese is a requirement. Sellers typically slather the toasted bun with cream cheese like a bagel while other sometimes use pistol-grip sauce dispensers to quickly add the thick cream cheese. The owner of Dante's Inferno Dogs says that he was the first to introduce their use.

Grilled onions are one of the most popular additions. Other toppings include jalapeños and other peppers, sauerkraut or grilled cabbage, and scallions. Condiments such as mustard (American yellow or spicy brown), barbecue sauce, and Sriracha sauce are favorites, while ketchup is used less often.

== See also ==
- List of hot dogs
