= Świętokrzyskie cuisine =

Świętokrzyskie cuisine is an umbrella term for all dishes with a specific regional identity belonging to the region of Świętokrzyskie. It is a subtype of Polish and Galician cuisine with many similarities to and signs of the influence of neighbouring cuisines.

== List of Świętokrzyskie dishes ==
=== Pastry and baked goods ===
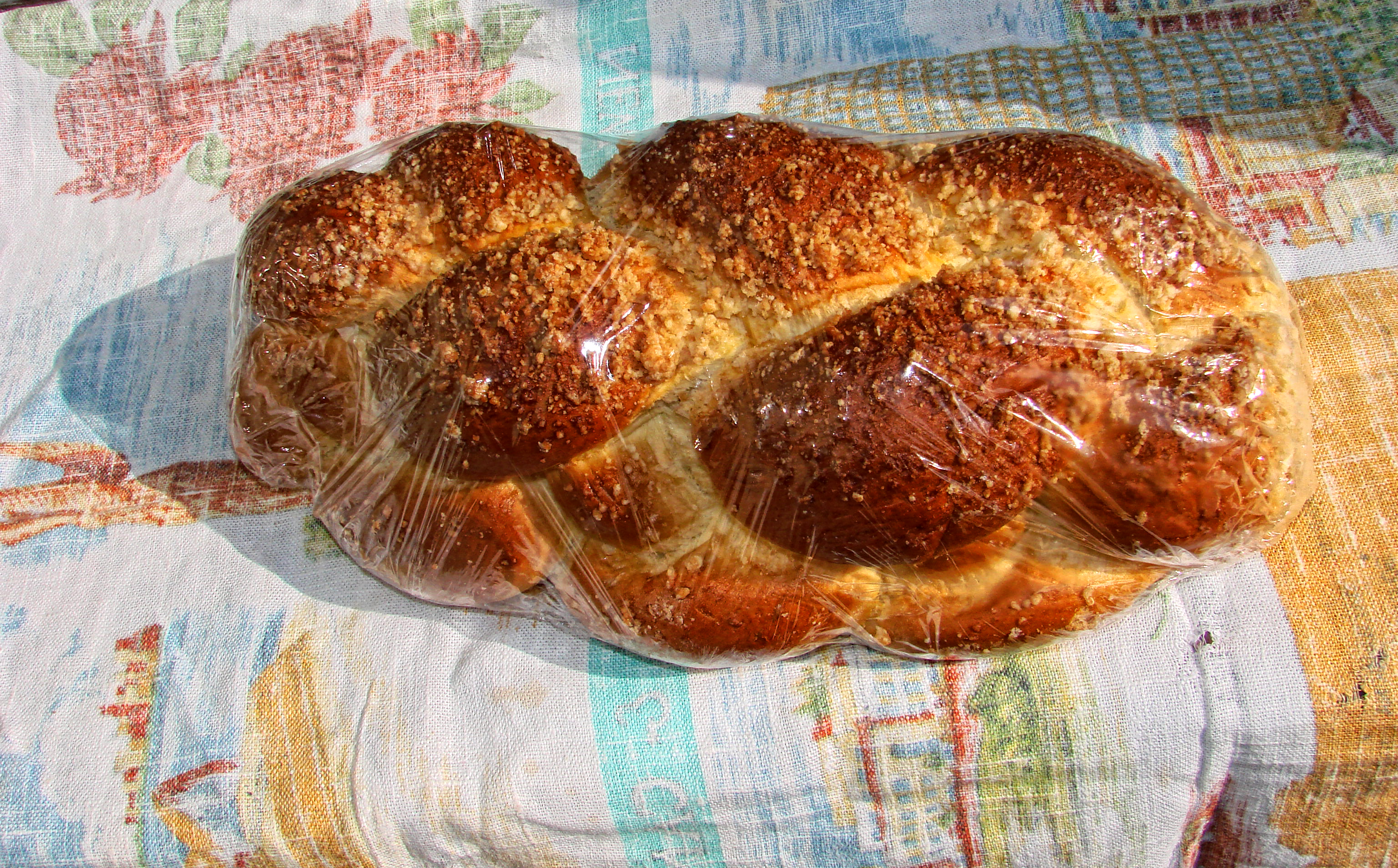
Chałka

- Burocorz bogoryjski - oval, bread-like sweet bake with a hint of beet
- Gryska - oval-shaped wheat bread, with a minute salty taste
- Krówka opatowska (Opatów krówka) - milk condensate sweet with a minute vanilla taste; produced since the year 1980
- Pączek opatowski (Opatów pączek) - yeast-cake pączek, traditionally with plum marmalade or rose filling
- Piernik z żytniej mąki (piernik from rye flour) - creamy, honey and root gingerbread
- Szczodroki - a yeast-cake and śmietana rogal
- Wólecka chałka pleciona - traditional chałka from Wola Wiśniowska; creamy, quadruply plaited bread roll

=== Soups ===
- Fitka kazimierska - traditional soup from Kazimierza County; made from potatoes, vegetables, pork rind from fatback, barley kasza and tomato purée
- Jacentowski barszcz z kapustą - traditional barszcz from Jacentów; barszcz with cabbage
- Zalewajka świętokrzyska - żurek with diced potatoes, with kiełbasa or smoked bacon, onion and pork rind

=== Fish dishes ===
- Rytwiański karp w galarecie - Rytwiany carp prepared in aspic

=== Pork and beef dishes ===
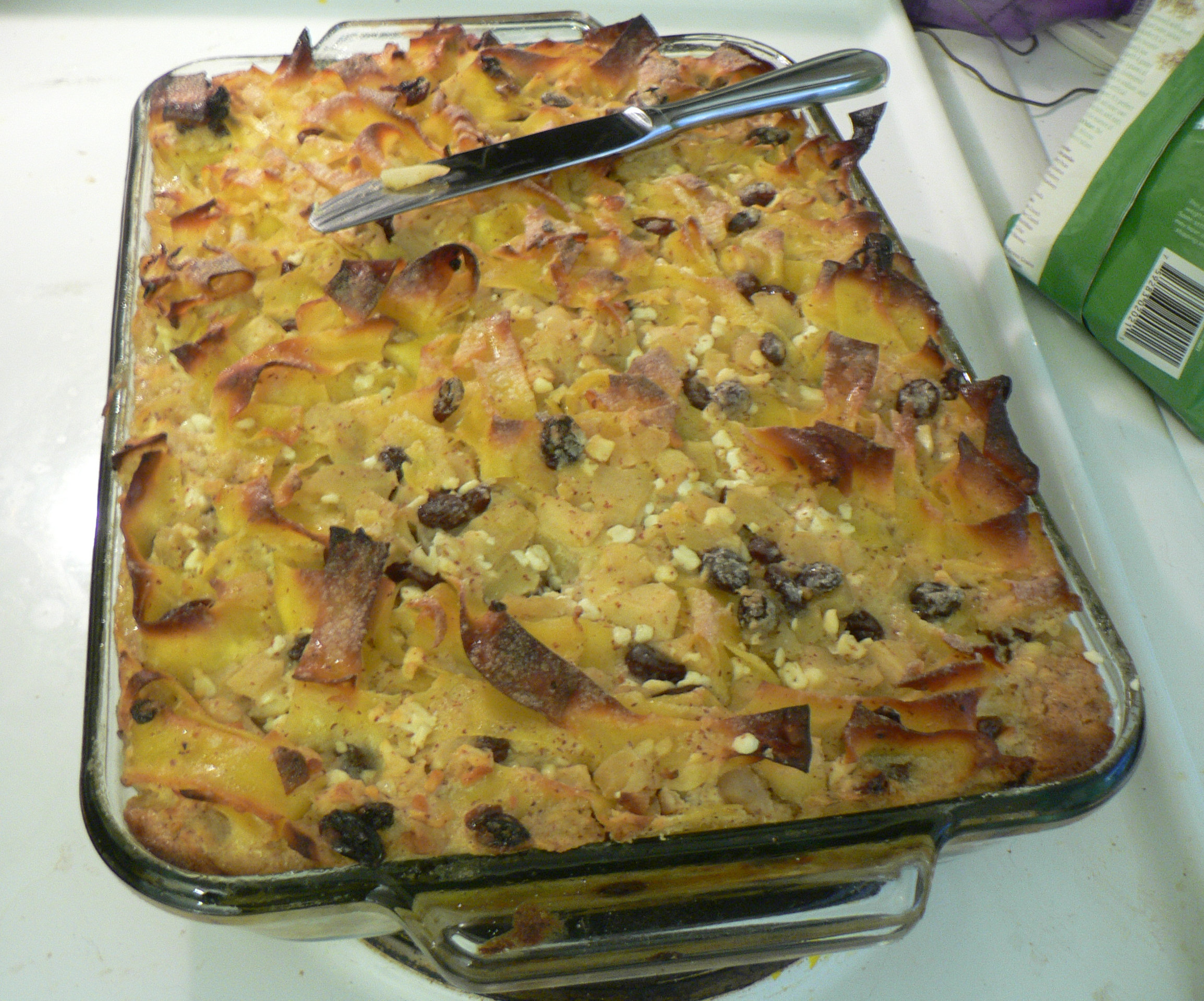
Kugiel

- Dzionie rakowskie - kaszanka made from pork or beef intestine, visually similar to kaszanka pâté
- Kaszanka szarbianka - kaszanka with groat kasza in pork intestine
- Kiełbasa łosieńska - traditional Łosień smoked kiełbasa
- Kiełbasa radoszycka - traditional Radoszyce kiełbasa, with an elongated, characteristic orange colour
- Kiełbasa swojska opatwowska (homemade Opatów kiełbasa) - traditional kiełbasa from Opatów; aromatic oak taste with garlic and pepper
- Kiełbasa swojska wąchocka hycowana (homemade Wąchock kiełbasa) - traditional Wąchock kiełbasa, with an intense alder, birch, and heavy garlic flavor
- Kiełbasa z Pacanowa - traditional kiełbasa from Pacanów with an aromatic garlic taste
- Polędwica tradycyjna z Wąchocka - traditional Wąchock sirloin

=== Stews, vegetable and potato dishes ===
- Farsz z kaszy gryczanej - groat kasza stuffing, traditional stuffing from the village of Małyszyn Dolny, in the centre-north of Świętokrzyskie Voivodeship
- Kugiel - noodle-like dish made from potatoes, served with meat
- Prazoki - kluski-like dish made from boiled potatoes and steamed flour, served with fatback and onion
- Rakowiski ziemniak pieczony - originating from the village of Dębno; sweet taste
- Słupiański siekaniec dworski - rouladen dish, sliced into roughly 1.5 cm-wide pieces; includes gentian and groat kasza
- Żabieckie gały - small, round kluski with speck and bacon lard

== See also ==
- List of Polish dishes
- Lublin cuisine
- Podlaskie cuisine
