= Bialy (bread) =

Yeasted bread roll

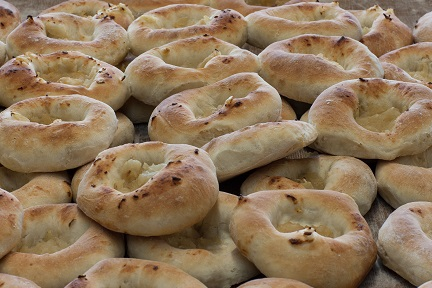
- Type: Bread
- Course: Breakfast, Brunch
- Place of origin: Poland
- Region or state: Central Europe
- Created by: Polish Jews
- Main ingredients: Flour, onions

Bialy (Note: /biˈɑːli/ or /biˈæli/; Yiddish: ביאַלי byali, short for byalistoker kuchen Yiddish: ביאַליסטאָקער קוכען, from the city of Białystok in Poland) is a type of bread roll, in which the center is indented and is traditionally covered with chopped onion and sprinkled with poppy seeds. The bialy was a part of the traditional Ashkenazi cuisine of the Jewish population of the city of Białystok in Poland until the destruction of the community during the Holocaust. Jewish immigrants brought the bialy to New York City, where it remains popular as an alternative to the bagel. It has become available, to a lesser extent, in other cities in the United States and elsewhere, and with additional or different flavorings and toppings.

== Overview ==
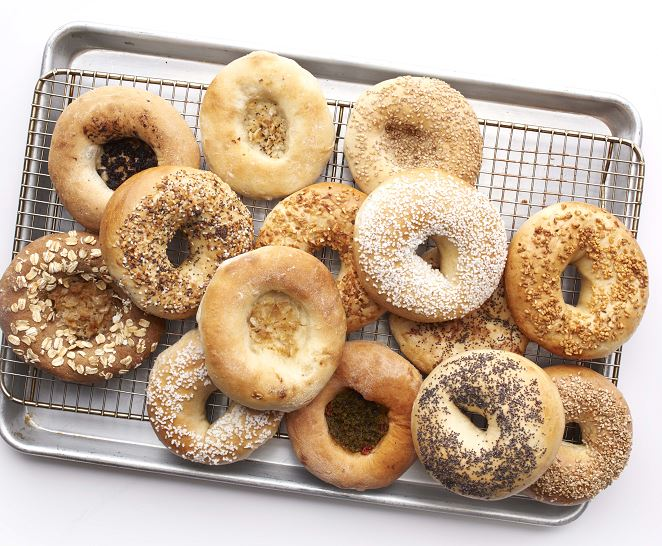
Bialys (without holes) and bagels (with)

A chewy yeast roll bearing similarity to the bagel, the bialy has a diameter of up to 15 centimetres (6 in). Unlike a bagel, which is boiled before baking, a bialy is baked, and instead of a hole in the middle, it has a depression. It is also usually covered with onion flakes. Before baking, the depression is sometimes filled with diced onion and other ingredients, such as garlic, poppy seeds, or bread crumbs.

== Variations ==
The bialy was brought to the United States by Polish Jewish immigrants in the late 19th century, and became a staple of Jewish bakeries in the Northeastern United States. Bialys became a popular breakfast bread in New York City and its suburbs, especially among American Jews. Bagel bakeries often make bialys, but they have failed to reach mainstream popularity. Traditionally, preparing bialys is time-consuming, so many bakeries now use dough mixers, as is common in bagel making. Bialys are considered an iconic New York City food, and can be difficult to find outside that area, but frozen bialys are sold under several brand names, such as Ray's New York, in supermarkets across the US.

== In popular culture ==
Former New York Times food writer Mimi Sheraton wrote The Bialy Eaters: The Story of a Bread and a Lost World, a 2000 book dedicated to the bialy and its role as a symbol of the Jewish heritage of Białystok.

== See also ==
- Kossar's Bialys, the oldest bialy bakery in the United States
- Cebularz and pletzel, two similar breads
- Seattle-style hot dog, originally served with cream cheese on a bialy stick
