= Cebularz =

Wheat dough pancake

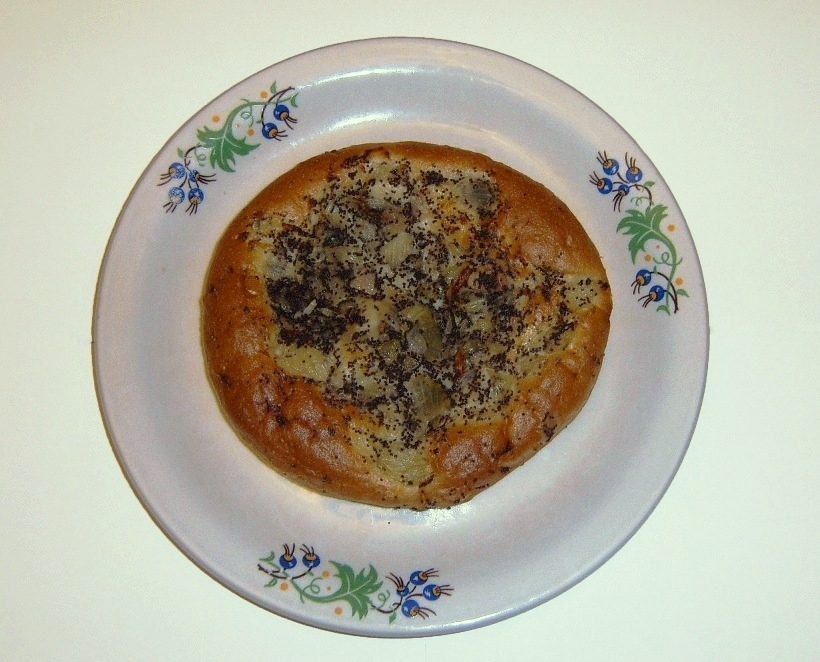
- Cebularz from Zamość
- Type: Bread
- Place of origin: Galicia, Poland
- Serving temperature: Cold
- Main ingredients: Dough: wheat dough; onion

Cebularz is a wheat dough pancake in Polish and Ashkenazi Jewish cuisine, with a diameter of 15-20 cm, topped with diced onion and poppy seeds, characteristic for Lublin cuisine.

Cebularz is one of the most popular dishes in the Lublin area. The recipe for the pancake was passed down the generations, with written records since the nineteenth-century. The first to bake the pancake was Jews, selling their produce in Lublin Old Town. Before World War II they were already widely popular in Lublin Voivodeship.

In 2007, cebularz was registered on the Polish Ministry of Agriculture and Rural Development's List of Traditional Products. In August 2014, cebularz pancakes have been placed on the European Union's Geographical Indications and Traditional Specialities list.

== See also ==
- Bialy
- Pletzel
