= Brzozowica Duża =

- Village
- Location within Poland
- Coordinates: 51°57′N 22°37′E
- Country: Poland
- Voivodeship: Lublin
- County: Radzyń
- Gmina: Kąkolewnica Wschodnia
- Population: 1,200 inhabitants

Brzozowica Duża [bʐɔzɔˈvit͡sa ˈduʐa] is a village in the administrative district of Gmina Kąkolewnica Wschodnia, within Radzyń County, Lublin Voivodeship, in eastern Poland.
