= Żakowola Radzyńska =

- Village
- Location within Poland
- Coordinates: 51°52′09″N 22°41′53″E
- Country: Poland
- Voivodeship: Lublin
- County: Radzyń
- Gmina: Kąkolewnica Wschodnia

Żakowola Radzyńska [ʐakɔˈvɔla raˈd͡zɨɲska] is a village in the administrative district of Gmina Kąkolewnica Wschodnia, within Radzyń County, Lublin Voivodeship, in eastern Poland.
