= Pomeranian cuisine =

Culinary traditions of the Pomerania region

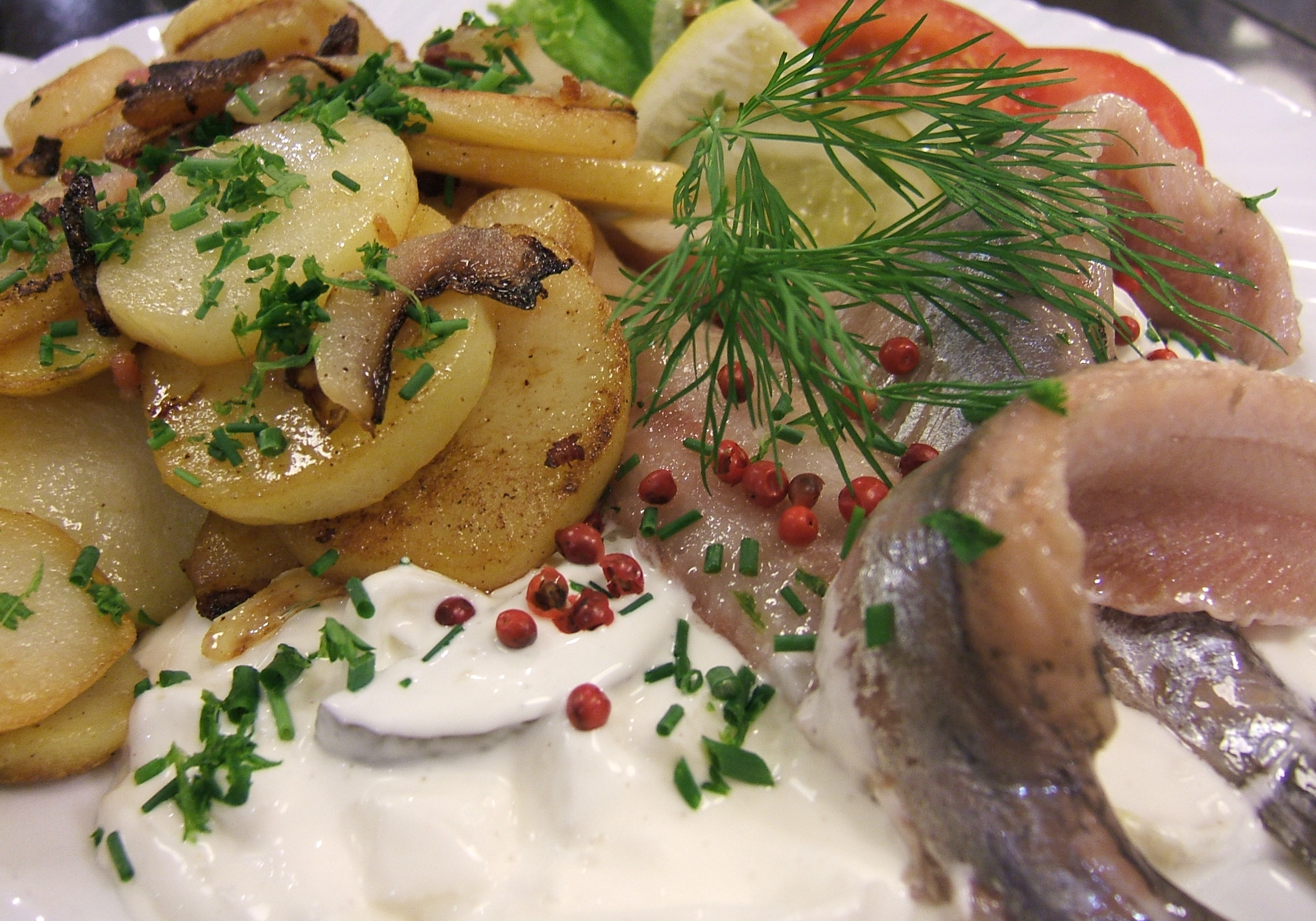
Pomeranian cuisine is famous for its great variety of fish dishes, such as herring in cream ("Sahnehering", pictured) and Bismarck herring.

Pomeranian cuisine generally refers to dishes typical of the area that once formed the historic Province of Pomerania in northeast Germany and which included Stettin (now Szczecin) and Further Pomerania. It is characterised by ingredients produced by Pomeranian farms, such as swede (Wruken) and sugar beet, by poultry rearing, which has produced the famous Pomeranian goose, by the wealth of fish in the Baltic Sea, rivers and inland lakes of the Pomeranian Lake District, and the abundance of quarry in Pomeranian forests. Pomeranian cuisine is hearty. Several foodstuffs have a particularly important role to play here in the region: potatoes, known as Tüften, prepared in various ways and whose significance is evinced by the existence of a West Pomeranian Potato Museum (Vorpommersches Kartoffelmuseum), Grünkohl and sweet and sour dishes produced, for example, by baking fruit.

Pomeranian farmers were self-sufficient: crops were stored until the following harvest, meat products were preserved in the smoke store of the home, or in the smokeries of larger villages such as Schlawin. Fruit, vegetables, lard and Gänseflomen were preserved by bottling in jars. Syrup was made from the sugar beet itself.

== Specialities ==
=== Soups ===
- Gänseschwarzsauer
- Kliebensuppe
- Pomeranian duck soup (Pommersche Entensuppe)

=== Fish ===
- Gebackener Spickaal (baked, smoked eel)
- Braden Maischull
- Pomeranian caviar (Pommerscher Kaviar)

=== Pork and beef dishes ===
- Kloppschinken
- Topfleberwurst
- Mecklenburg roast ribs (Mecklenburger Rippenbraten)

=== Stews, vegetable and potato dishes ===
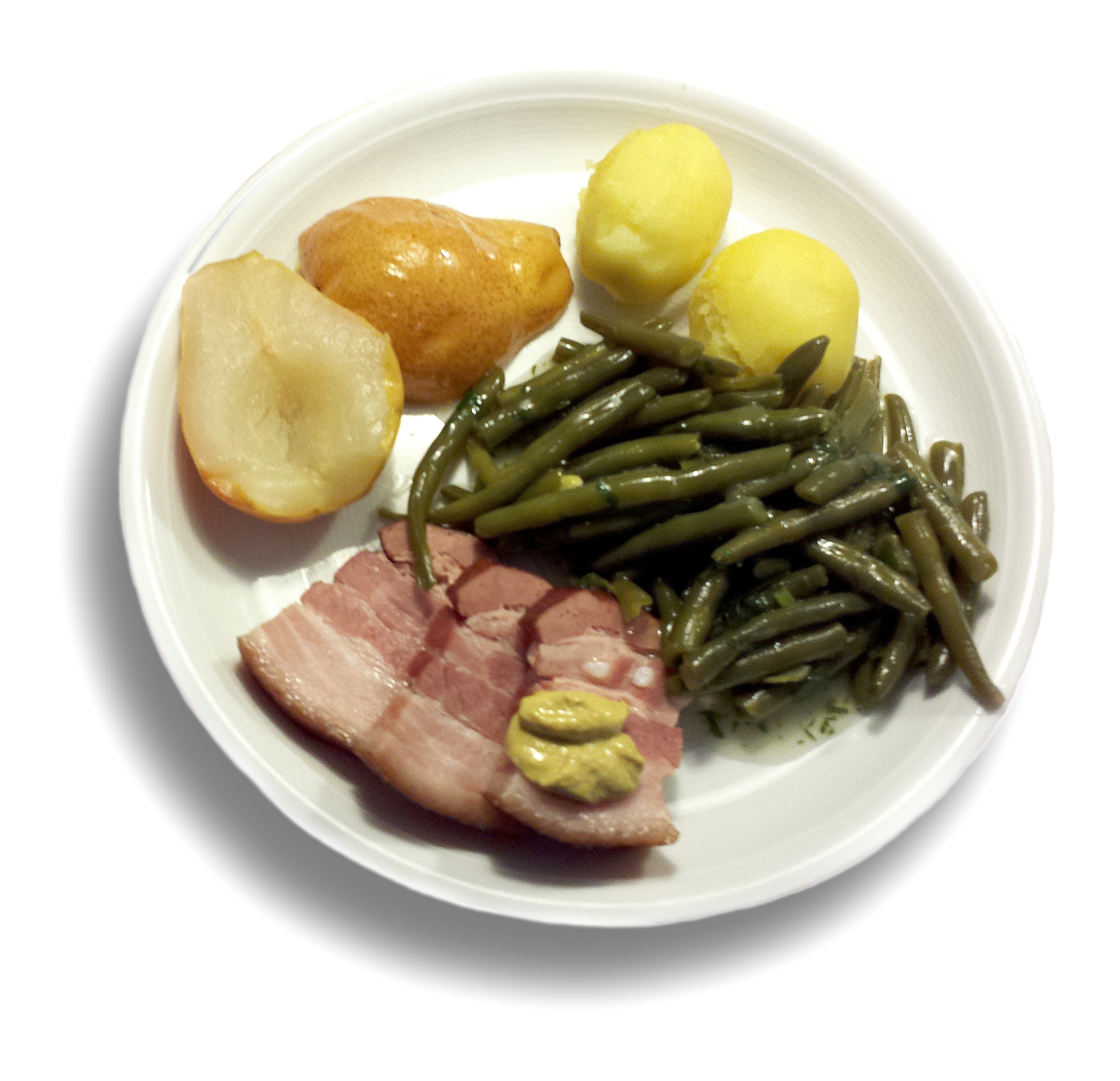
Birnen, Bohnen und Speck

- Tüffel un Plum (potato soup with plums and bacon)
- Buttermilk soup with bacon and onions in the Pomeranian style (Buttermilchsuppe mit Speck und Zwiebeln auf pommersche Art)
- Elderberry soup (Fliederbeersuppe)
- Pomeranian wheat blintzes (Pommersche Hefeplinsen)
- Pomeranian dumplings (Pommersche Klöße)
- Pomeranian Tollatsch (Pommersche Tollatschen)
- Schwemmklöße
- Buttermilk potatoes (Buttermilchkartoffel)
- Birnen, Bohnen und Speck

=== Puddings ===
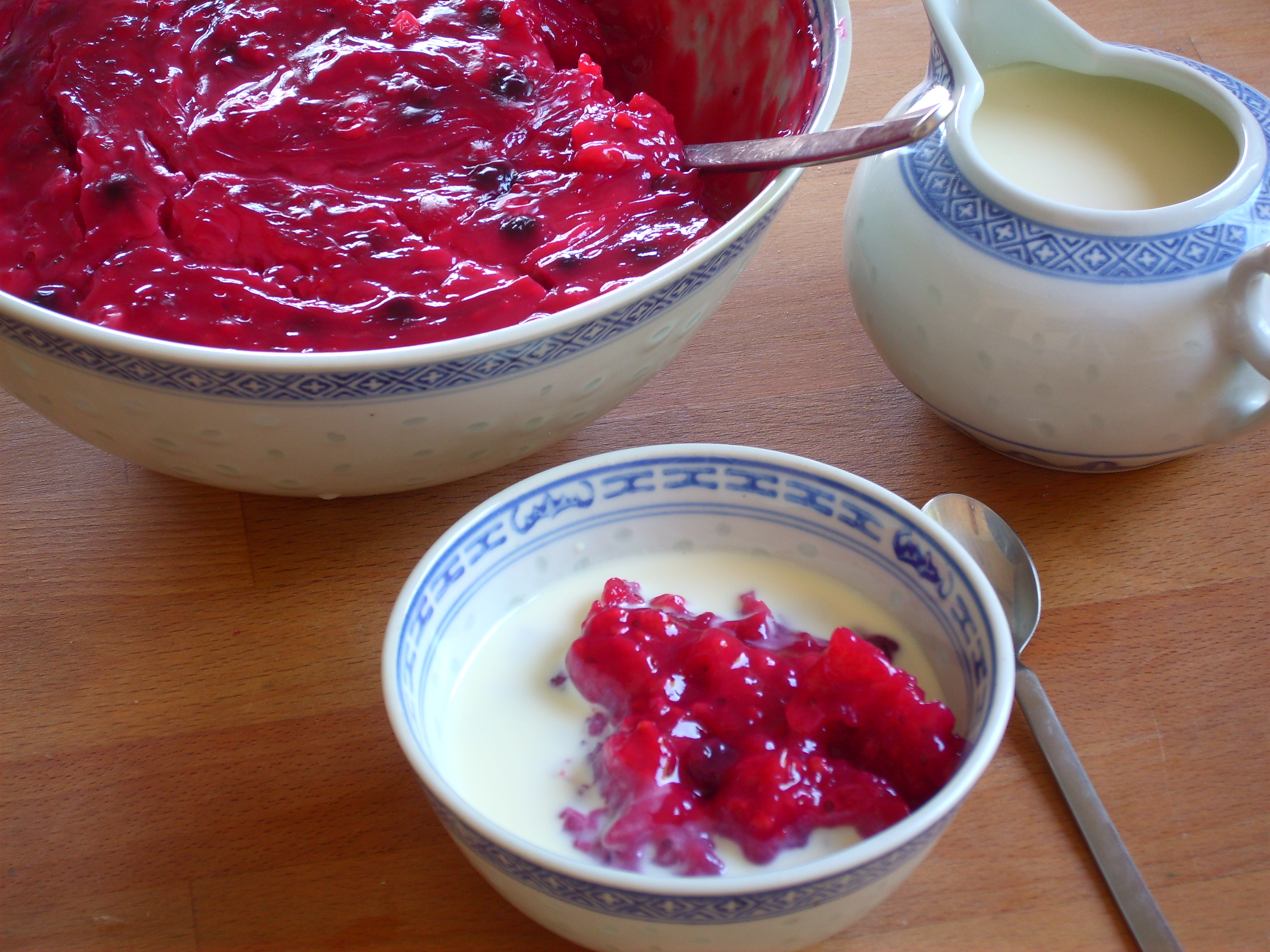
Rote Grütze is a popular sweet pudding in Pomerania, usually served with vanilla sauce.

- Black bread pudding (Schwarzbrotpudding)
- Götterspeise
- Rote Grütze
- Mandelkringel
- Sour cream cake (Schmandpudding)

=== Christmas dishes ===
- Honigkuchen auf dem Blech
- Kleine pommersche Kuchen
- Pommersche Honigbutterküchlein
- Pommersche Quarkbollerchen
- White Pfeffernüsse (Weiße Pfeffernüsse)

=== Drink ===
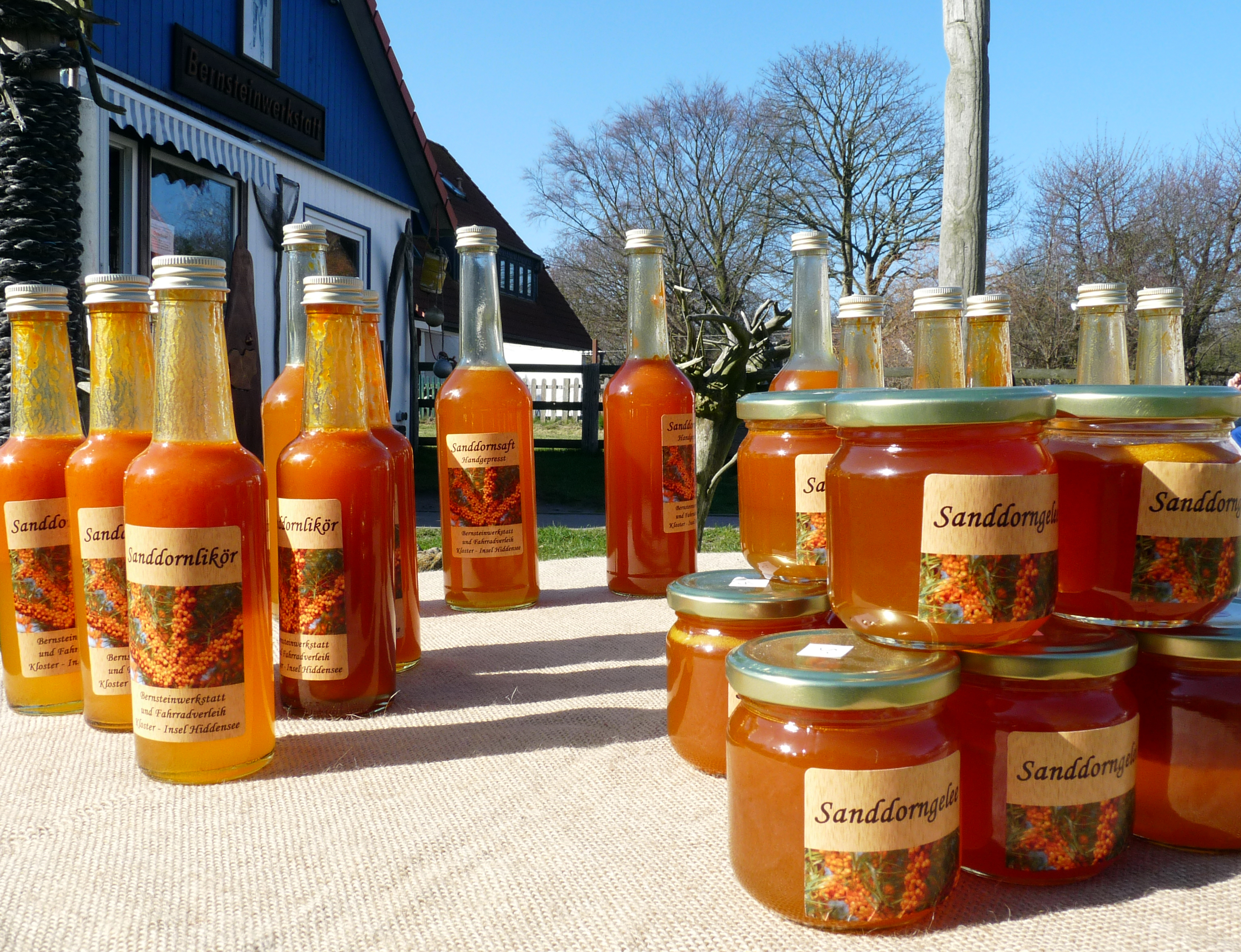
Sanddorn berries are made into all kinds of products in Western Pomerania; in addition to spirits and juice there are also jams.

- Grog
- Sanddorn: fruit wine, spirits, Sanddorn juice

==== Beers ====
- Barther Pils, Bernstein, Ritter Alkun, Honigbier, Bockbier and fruit beers from the Barth brewery
- Mellenthiner Hell, Dunkel; seasonally also Weizen, Bock, Eisbock, Rauch, Schwarz and Alt in the water castle at Mellenthin on the island of Usedom
- Störtebeker Pilsener, Schwarzbier, Bernstein-Weizen, "1402", Roggen-Weizen, Strand-Räuber Mix beers and Stark-Bier; Stralsunder Pils, Lager, Traditionsbock, etc. from the Störtebeker Braumanufaktur in Stralsund
- Usedomer Inselbier Pils, Naturtrüb, Weizen, Schwarz and Inselalster in the Usedom brewery in Heringsdorf (Usedomer Brauhaus at Ostseeresidenz)

== Gourmet food ==
Several renowned restaurants in Pomerania have been awarded for excellence in the 21st century. For example, amongst the starred restaurants listed in the 2015 Michelin Guide are the Freustil Restaurant in the Hotel Vier Jahreszeiten in Binz on the island of Rügen, which is run by chef André Münchs, Restaurant im Gutshaus Stolpe in Stolpe (Peene), the Tom Wickboldt Restaurant in Heringsdorf on the island of Usedom, as well as the gourmet restaurant Scheel's in the Scheelehof in Stralsund, headed by Stralsund chefs Björn Kapelke and Henri Zipperling.

The 2015 edition of the culinary guide Gault-Millau awarded chef Peter Knobloch's Knoblochs Kräuterküche in Göhren on Rügen with 16 of 20 points, an achievement also earned by the Freustil Restaurant under Ralf Haug in Binz. Ranked at 15 points were chef René Bobzin, of the Zur alten Post in Bansin on Usedom, and Tom Wickboldt leading the restaurant of the same name in neighbouring Heringsdorf. Other restaurant guides like the Varta-Führer, Bertelsmann Guide, Der Feinschmecker and the Schlemmer Atlas rate gourmet food in West Pomerania as high quality.

== Literature ==
- Susanne Rohner: Das Beste aus der Pommerschen Küche – Kochen mit Tradition. Dörfler, Eggolsheim, 2009, ISBN 9783895556326 (96 pages).
- Hans Otzen, Barbara Otzen: Danziger Hering und 130 weitere leckere Rezepte aus Pommern. Edition Lempertz, 2012, ISBN 9783939284116 (245 page).
- Hannelore Doll-Hegedo: Spezialitäten aus Pommern, gewürzt mit Anekdoten. Stürz Verlag, Leer, 2003, ISBN 9783800330485 (82 pages).
- H. von Geibler: Pommersches Kochbuch – Mit 631 selbst erprobten Rezepten. Achte vermehrte und verbesserte Auflage, Prangesche Buchhandlung und Verlagsanstalt, Kolberg 1925; photomechanischer Nachdruck: 2. Auflage, Hinstorff, Rostock, 1996, ISBN 3-356-00614-2 (256 pages).
- Dieter Kraatz: Rügen – Köstlichkeiten einer Inselküche. Rügendruck, 2011, ISBN 9783980899956 (135 pages).
- Utta Voutta: Pommern bittet zu Tisch. Herausgeber: Kreisfrauengruppe der Vereinigten Landsmannschaften e.V. (Bund der Vertriebenen), Kreis Rendsburg-Eckernförde, Eckenförde, 1986 (38 pages).
- Marie Rosnack: Stettiner Koch-Buch: Anweisung auf eine feine und schmackhafte Art zu kochen, zu backen und einzumachen. 4th ed., Nicolai'sche Buch- & Papierhandlung (C. F. Gutberlet), Stettin, 1838 (full text)
- Anita Weißflog: Die Küche des Landkreises Stolp. Eigenverlag, Dresden, 2007. (full text, pdf)
