= Götterspeise =

Dessert originated in Germany

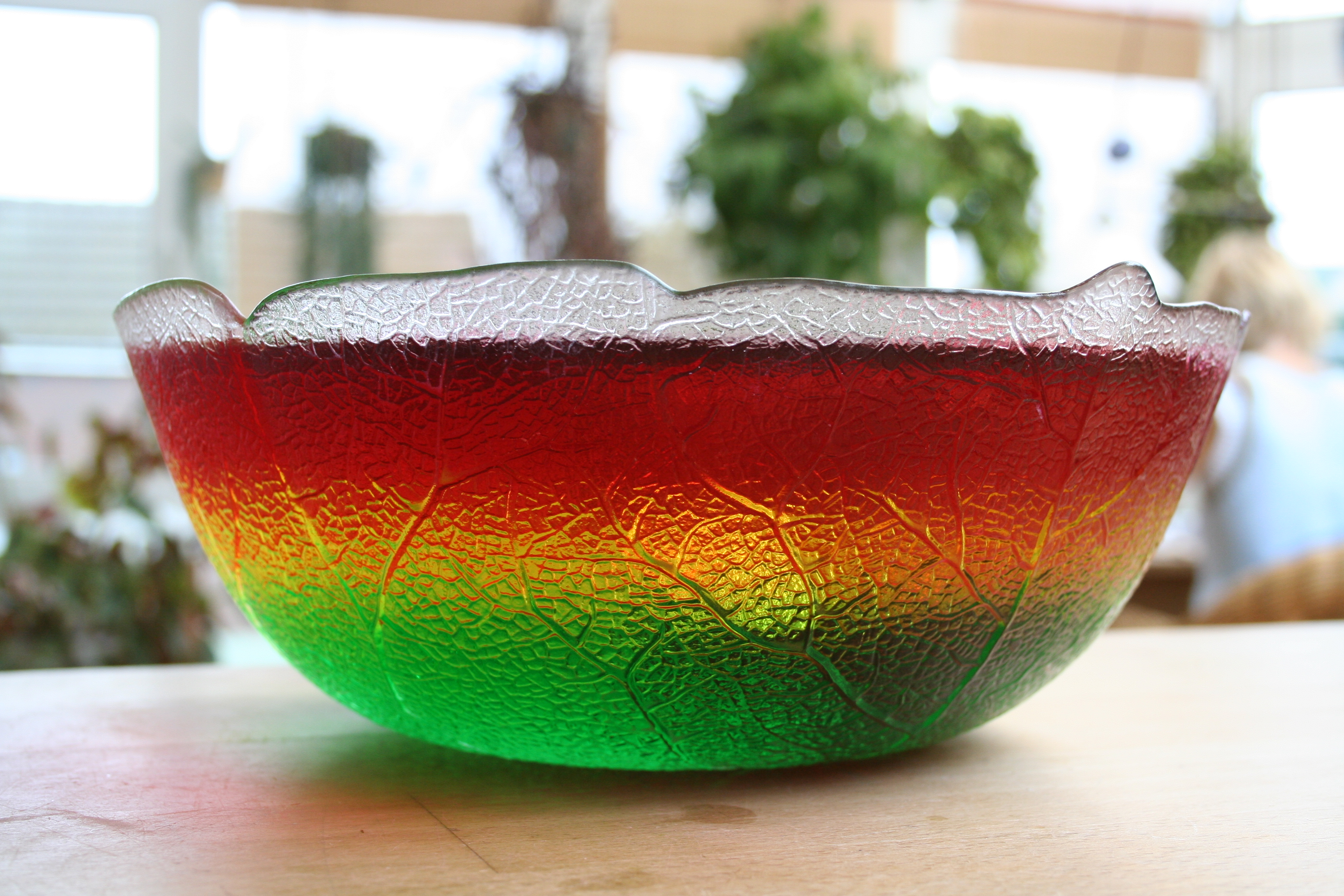
- Ampelpudding ("traffic light pudding")
- Alternative names: Wackelpudding, Wackelpeter, Froschsülze
- Type: Pudding
- Course: Dessert
- Place of origin: Germany
- Main ingredients: Gelatine or other gelling agent, sugar, flavourings, food colouring

Götterspeise (German: [ˈɡœtɐˌʃpaɪ̯zə], lit. 'dish/fare of the gods') is the German name for a dessert made of gelatine or other gelling agent, sugar, flavourings and food colouring, it is similar or identical to jelly or jello and other gelatin desserts. The name refers to the food of the Greek gods. Other German names include Wackelpudding ("wobbly pudding") or Wackelpeter (German: [ˈvakl̩ˌpeːtɐ]; "Wobbly Peter"); green Götterspeise is also known as Froschsülze ("frog jelly"). Götterspeise is usually eaten with whipped cream or vanilla sauce. The best-known flavours are the following:

- Woodruff (Waldmeister (pronounced [ˈvaltˌmaɪ̯stɐ]) – green
- Raspberry (Himbeere (pronounced [ˈhɪmˌbeːʁə]) – red
- Cherry (Kirsche) – red
- Lemon (Zitrone) – yellow

The green Götterspeise is not coloured with woodruff, the latter only gives the dessert its characteristic aroma. Because the coumarin contained in woodruff is toxic, only artificial woodruff flavouring is used in the trade.

A special type of Götterspeise is the triple-layered and three-coloured (red, yellow and green) Ampelpudding ("traffic light pudding"), which is made using three layers of separately cooled flavours.

== Food colouring ==
Götterspeise is usually coloured with artificial food colouring, azo compounds often being used.

- red colouring: azorubine (E 122), cochineal red A (E 124), brilliant blue FCF (E 133)
- yellow colouring: sunset yellow FCF (E 110), Quinoline Yellow WS (E 104)
- green colouring: Quinoline Yellow WS (E 104), patent blue V (E 131), sunset yellow FCF (E 110)

== Origin of the name Wackelpeter ==
The name Wackelpeter has its origins in the 19th century, when the name "Peter" was often used as a nickname to describe something humorously (see also Hackepeter and Struwwelpeter). Moreover, the gelatine mass of the pudding wobbles (wackelt) when shaken. Wackelpeter or Wackelpudding also means a pudding.

== See also ==
- Almond jelly
- Gummy candies
- Jelly bean
- Jell-O
- Knox gelatin
- Jello salad, a variation on gelatin desserts that include other ingredients
