= Ore Mountain cuisine =

Cuisine

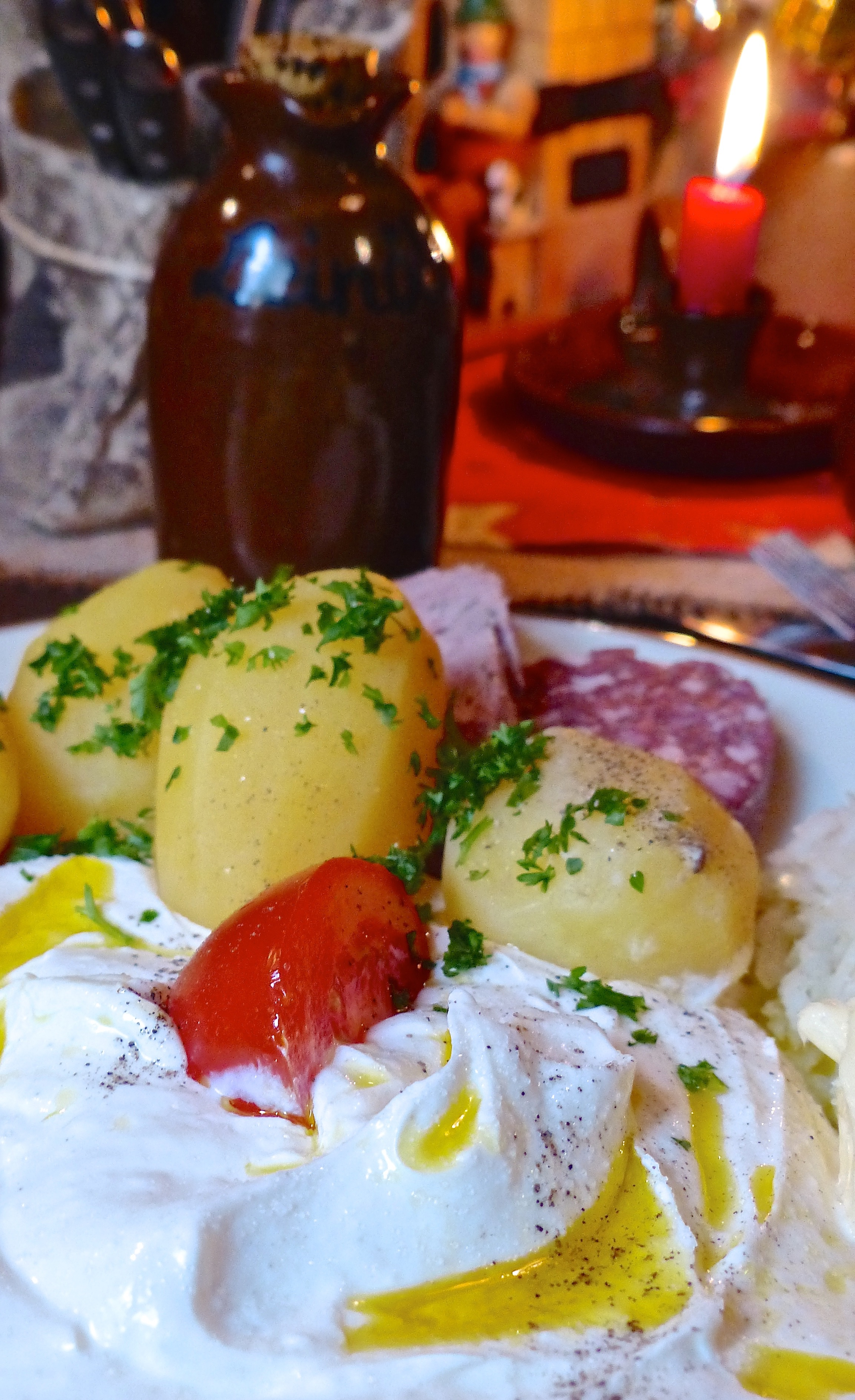
Energy rich, simple dish: potatoes, quark with linseed oil, Blutwurst and Leberwurst

Cuisine in the Ore Mountains was dominated for centuries by the changing economic circumstances of the mining, handicraft and forestry industries, as well as the fortunes of home-based crafts. This is reflected, on the one hand, in the simplicity of cooking ingredients, the art of improvisation and creativity of the Ore Mountain housewife, and, on the other hand, in the very rich cuisine of the manor houses. For example, the lords of Schönberg, who had the closest relations with the court at Dresden, demonstrated their prosperity at the dining table. They also benefited from long-distance trade, thanks to the strategic location of their strongholds in Sayda and Purschenstein, which were situated on the so-called Salt Road. Thus they were able to enjoy the exotic spices and culinary expertise that arrived in coaches and from which their kitchens also benefited.

== History ==
From the 12th century, with every berggeschrey (silver rush), the Ore Mountains experienced a fresh wave of immigrants. As a result, the cuisine of the region was subject to many influences from the lands in which the settlers originated. The 18th century, in particular, has left its mark on the dishes that are typical of the region today. When, in 1771–72, a period of great starvation arose for the last time in the mountains, the growing of potatoes was encouraged, even by the church in their so-called "tuber sermons" (Knollenpredigten). The potato plant thrived on the poor soils and harsh climate of the mountains and became the preferred food of the Ore Mountains. A variety of cooking methods was developed that still characterize today's traditional cuisine.

== Typical dishes ==
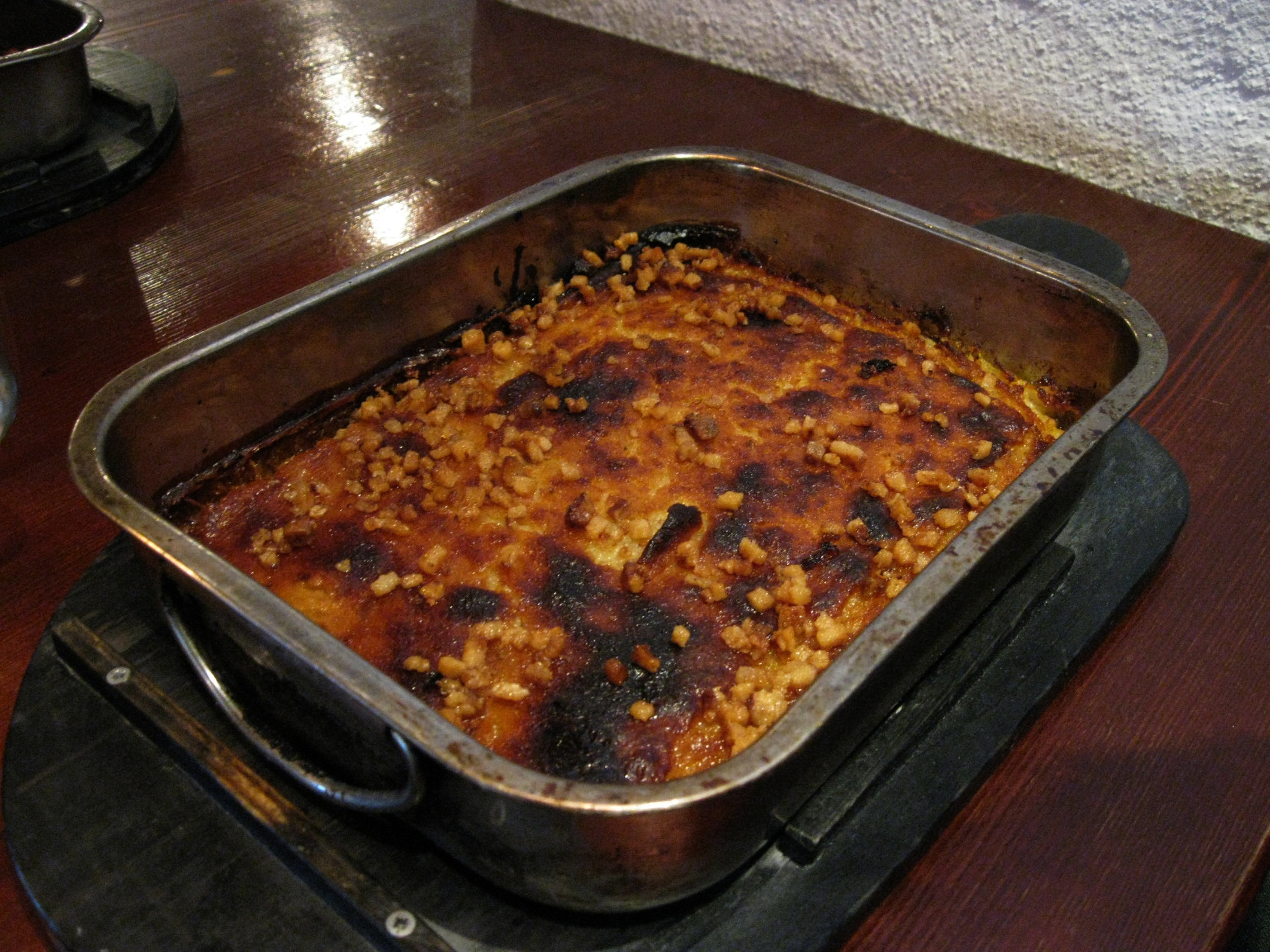
Buttermilchgetzen

Traditionally very common are various forms of potato pancake (Kartoffelpuffer) which may be served as sweet or savoury main courses as well as an accompaniment to meat. These especially include:

- Fratzen
- Klitscher
- Buttermilchgetzen
- Heidelbeergetzen

Fritters made of potato are also common, the best-known is the so-called Rauchemaad.

At Christmas, which is especially richly celebrated in the Ore Mountains, many households still make Neinerlaa. The ingredients vary from region to region, sometimes even from village to village. In any case, on Christmas Eve nine elements are served, for example, bratwurst, sauerkraut and lentils, each element supposedly having a special significance for the coming year. For example, dumplings stand for wealth and celery for fertility

== Literature ==
- Uwe Schirmer: Ernährung im Erzgebirge im 15. und 16. Jahrhundert. Produktion, Handel und Verbrauch. In: Rainer Aurig, Steffen Herzog, Simone Lässig (ed.): Landesgeschichte in Sachsen. Tradition und Innovation (Studien zur Regionalgeschichte 10), Bielefeld, 1997, pp. 129–144 ISBN 3-89534-210-6
- Helmut Bräuer: Reflexionen über den Hunger im Erzgebirge um 1700. In: Manfred Hettling (ed.): Figuren und Strukturen: historische Essays für Hartmut Zwahr zum 65. Geburtstag, München: Saur, pp. 225–239 ISBN 3-598-11585-7
- Gotthard B. Schicker: Gutguschn - Das erste Kochbuch aus dem Erzgebirge. Annaberg-Buchholz, Verlag Erzgebirgs-Rundschau, 1991, (4th ed., 2005) ISBN 978-3-931770-761
- Ingeborg Delling: Holundersuppe und saure Schwamme: das kleine Kochbuch der Erzgebirger und Vogtländer. Chemnitzer Verlag, 1997 ISBN 3-928678-10-8
- Erzgebirgs-Verlag Häckel (pub.): Dr' arzgebirgsche Kochtopp – Alte Kochrezepte aus dem Erzgebirge. Oberwiesenthal, 2005 ISBN 3-9803680-6-8
- Roswitha Richter: Dr' arzgebirgsche Kochtopp 2: wieder entdeckt und aufbereitet. Erzgebirgs-Verlag Häckel, Oberwiesenthal, 2005 ISBN 3-9803680-6-8
- Ehrhardt Heinold: Ardäppelsupp und Zwiebelquark: die schönsten Rezepte aus dem Erzgebirge. Husum: Husum, 2006 ISBN 3-89876-261-0
- Ingeborg Delling: Grüne Kließ und Schwammebrüh: Kleines Kochbuch der Erzgebirger und Vogtländer. Chemnitzer Verlag, 2007 ISBN 978-3-937025-37-7
- Ehrhardt Heinold: Neunerlei und Gänsebraten: eine literarisch-kulinarische Reise ins Erzgebirge; mit einem erzgebirgischen Küchen-ABC. Husum: Verlag der Nation, 2009 ISBN 978-3-373-00531-5
