= Fatback =

Cut of meat from a domestic pig

1: fatback

Fatback is a layer of subcutaneous fat taken from under the skin of the back of a domestic pig, with or without the skin (referred to as pork rind).

== In cuisine ==
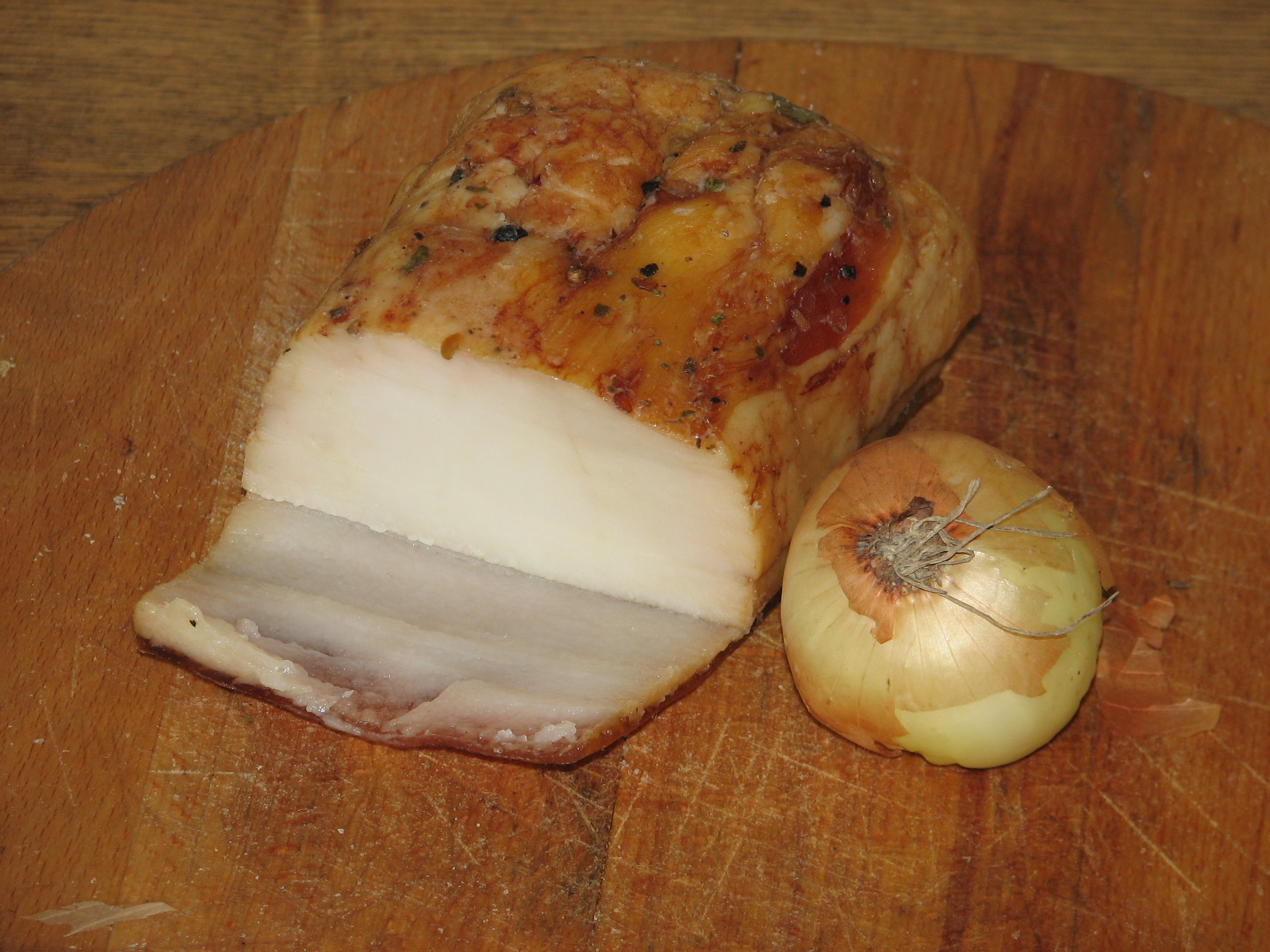
Salo, a Ukrainian dish of salt-cured fatback

As an ingredient, fatback is a preferred fat for various forms of charcuterie, particularly sausages and forcemeats for pâtés and terrines. It is used to add moisture and richness to pork based dishes.

Salt-cured on its own, it becomes lardo in Italy and salo in Eastern Europe; szalonna in Hungary is salted and smoked.

Fatback can be rendered into lard.

Fatback is an important ingredient in Southern US cuisine.

== In popular culture ==
The 1954 rhythm and blues song "Fat Back and Corn Liquor" was written by Louisiana songwriter Rudy Toombs and sung by Louis Jordan. It was released by Aladdin Records as the A side of a ten-inch 78rpm record.

Hunter S. Thompson mentions fatback in the context of depravity: "It was sometime after midnight in a ratty hotel room and my memory of the conversation is hazy, due to massive ingestion of booze, fatback, and forty cc's of adrenochrome."

== See also ==
- Butcher – Craftsperson responsible for the preparation and sale of meat
- List of bacon dishes
