= Baran =

Baran may refer to:

- Baran (name)

== Places ==
=== Europe ===
- Baran, Belarus, a town
- Baran, Lublin Voivodeship, a village in Poland
- Baran, Świętokrzyskie Voivodeship, a village in Poland
- Uroczysko Baran killing fields near Kąkolewnica, Poland
- Baran, Russia, several rural localities in Russia

=== Africa ===
- Baran, Sool, in the Sool province of Somalia
- Badhan, Sanaag, in Somalia, also known as Baran
- Baran, alternative name of Buraan, a town in Somalia

=== Asia ===
- Baran district, in the state of Rajasthan in India
- Baran, Rajasthan, a city in Baran district, India
- Bulandshahr, India, earlier known as Baran
- Baran, Khuzestan, a village in Iran
- Bārān, alternative name of Borj-e Balan, a village in Markazi Province, Iran
- Baran Duz (Castle of Baran), a village in Iran
- Baran, Pakistan, a village

== Arts and entertainment ==
- Baran (film), by Majid Majidi, released in 2001
- Baran, 2014 album by Parvaaz (band)
- Baran, a character in the anime/manga series Dragon Quest: Dai no Daibōken
- Baran, Japanese spelling of Varan, a fictional monster lizard

== See also ==
- Barran (disambiguation)
- Barang (disambiguation)
- Borran (disambiguation)
- Jhalawar–Baran (Lok Sabha constituency), Rajasthan, India
