= John Barron =

John Barron may refer to:

- John Barron (classicist) (1934–2008), British classical scholar
- John Barron (actor) (1920–2004), English actor, best known for The Fall and Rise of Reginald Perrin
- John Barron (footballer) (1879–1908), Scottish footballer
- John Barron (hurler) (1934–2008), Irish sportsman
- John Barron (Maine politician), state senator
- John Barron (American journalist) (1930–2005), American journalist who wrote about the Cold War and Soviet Union
- John Augustus Barron (1850–1936), Canadian politician and lawyer
- John Hall Barron (1873–1951), British philatelist
- John Barron (Australian journalist) (born 1971), Australian journalist and television presenter
- John Barron, publisher and former editor of the Chicago Sun-Times
- John Barron, plaintiff in the Supreme Court case Barron v. Baltimore
- John Barron (pseudonym), a pseudonym used by Donald Trump in the 1980s

== See also ==
- John Shepherd-Barron (1925–2010), British inventor
- John Baron (disambiguation)
- John Barran (disambiguation)
