= Wygnanka =

Wygnanka may refer to the following places:

- Wygnanka, Gmina Sosnówka, Biała County in Lublin Voivodeship (east Poland)
- Wygnanka, Lubartów County in Lublin Voivodeship (east Poland)
- Wygnanka, Radzyń County in Lublin Voivodeship (east Poland)
- Wygnanka, Masovian Voivodeship (east-central Poland)
