= Opolian Silesia =

Opole Silesia/Opolian Silesia Śląsk Opolski (Polish) Oppelner Schlesien (German) Ôpolski Ślōnsk (Silesian)
- Historical region
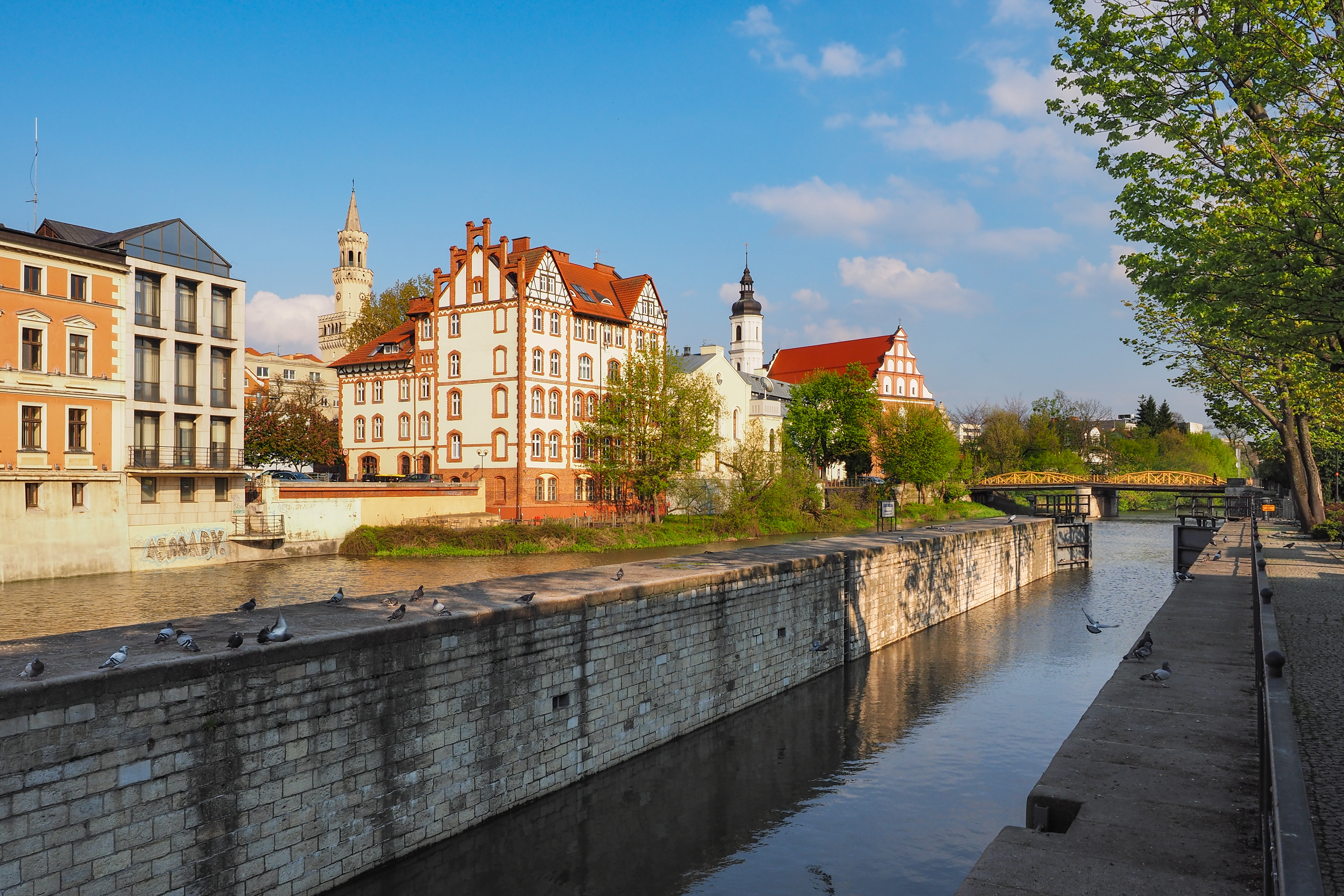
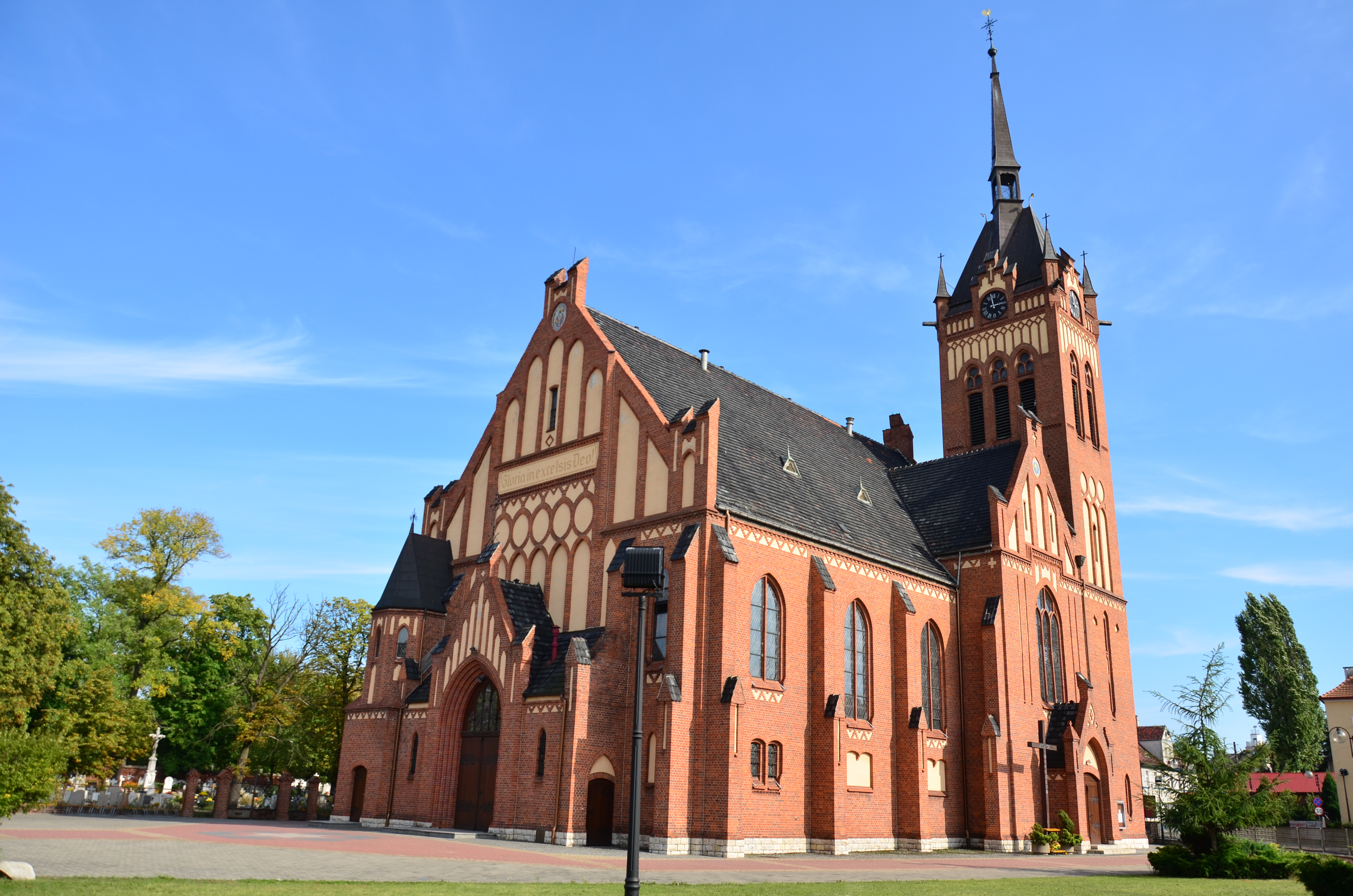
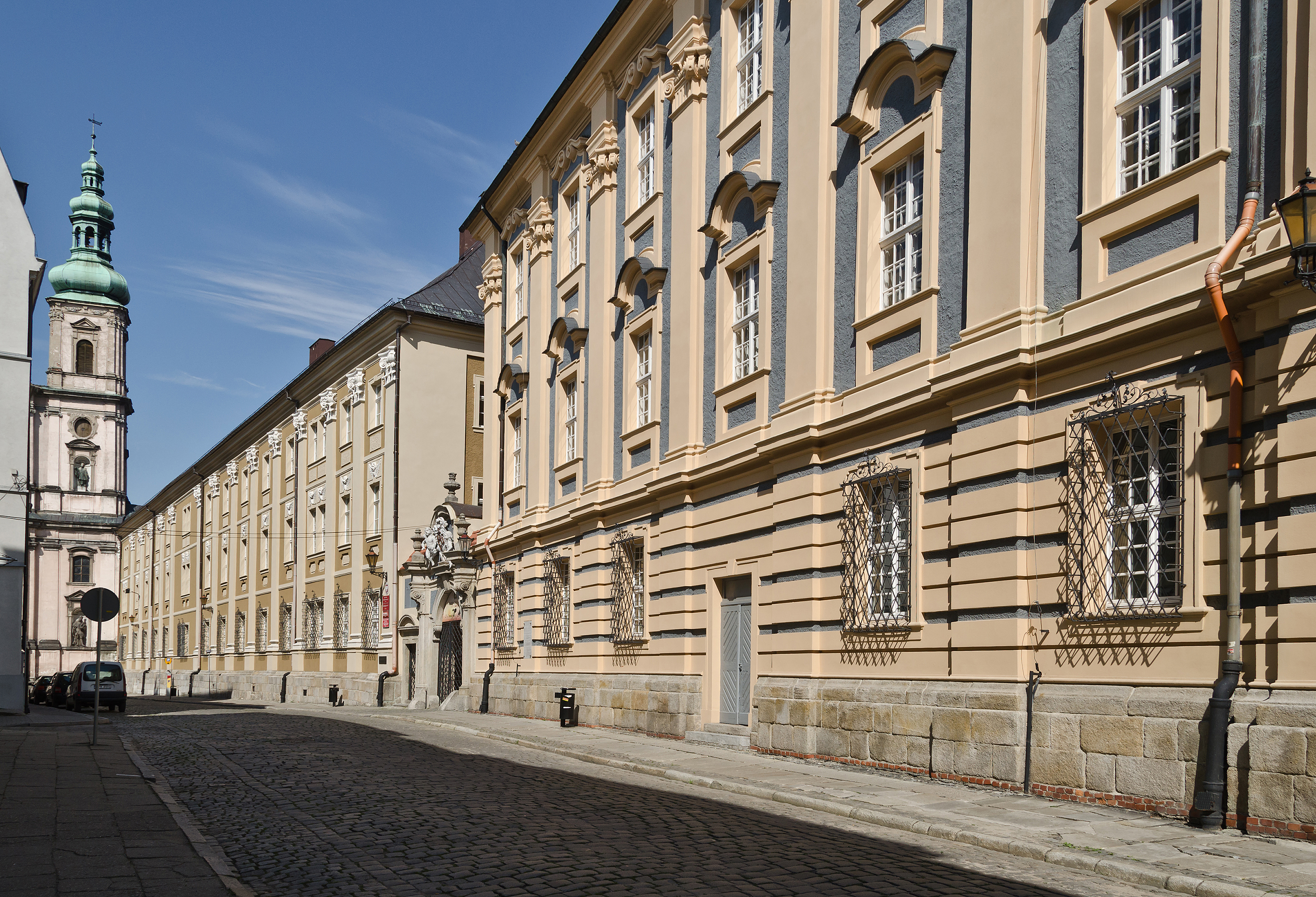
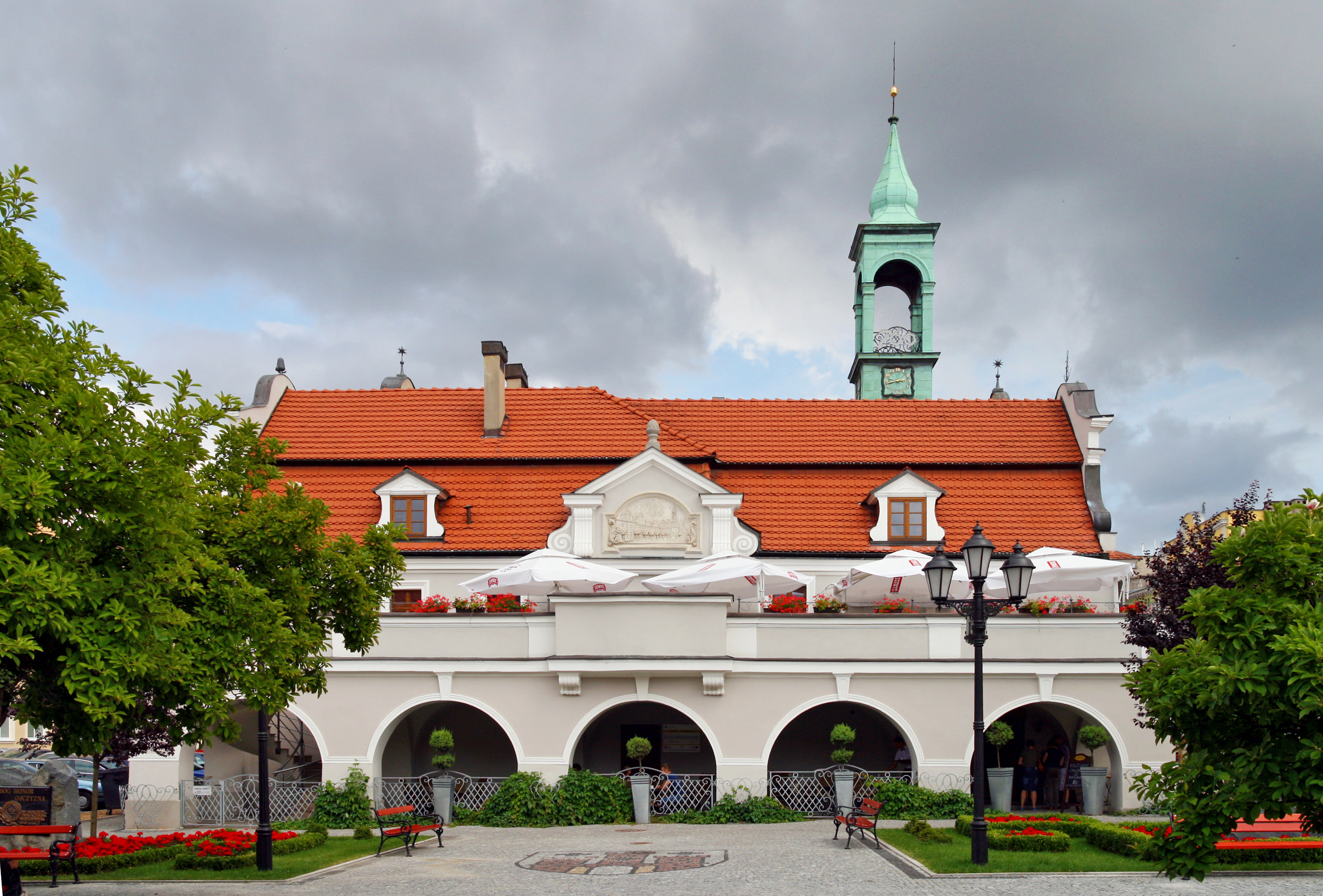
- From top, left to right: Opole Old Town; Saint Nicholas Church in Kędzierzyn-Koźle; Carolinum in Nysa; Kluczbork Town Hall

- Coat of arms

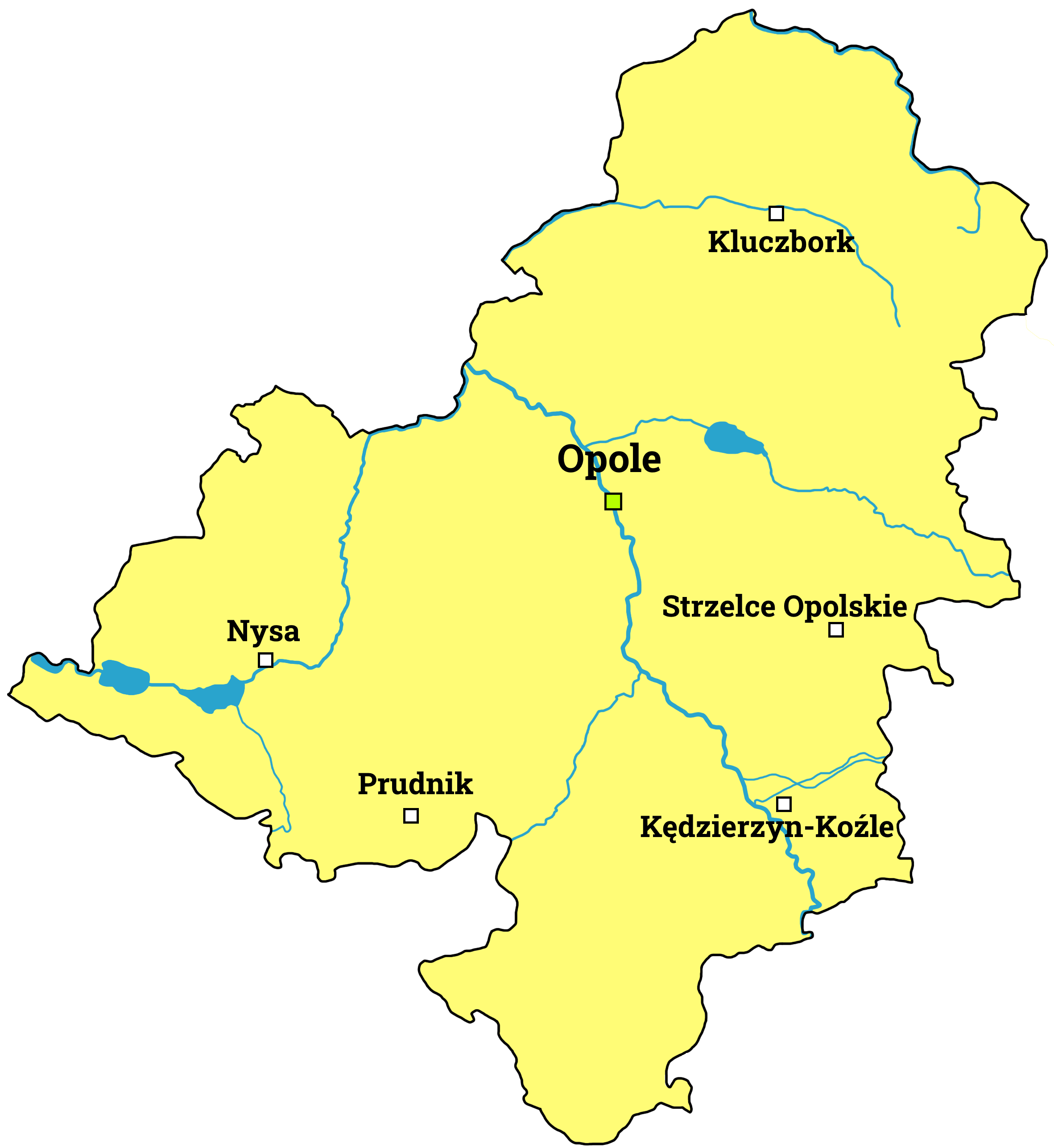
- Country: Poland
- Historical capital: Opole
- Time zone: UTC+1 (CET)
  - Summer (DST): UTC+2 (CEST)

Opole Silesia or Opolian Silesia (Polish: Śląsk Opolski, also known as Opolszczyzna, German: Oppelner Schlesien, Silesian: Ôpolski Ślōnsk, Czech: Opolské Slezsko), is a loosely defined historical region of Poland, part of Upper Silesia.

Throughout much of its history, the region was ruled by the Duchy of Opole and other Silesian duchies, formed during the medieval fragmentation of Piast-ruled Poland. Following the Silesian Wars, the region became part of Prussia, and from 1871 to 1945 it was incorporated into Germany. After Germany's defeat in World War II, in accordance with the Oder–Neisse line, Opole Silesia was reintegrated into Poland.

== See also ==
- Opole cuisine
- Opole Voivodeship
- Regierungsbezirk Oppeln
