= Communist crimes (Polish legal concept) =

Legal definition used in the Polish Penal Code

Communist crimes (Polish: zbrodnie komunistyczne) is a legal definition used in the Polish Penal Code. The concept of a communist crime is also used more broadly internationally, and is employed by human rights non-governmental organizations as well as government agencies such as the Unitas Foundation, the Institute for Information on the Crimes of Communism, the Institute for the Study of Totalitarian Regimes, the Institute for the Investigation of Communist Crimes in Romania, and the Office for the Documentation and the Investigation of the Crimes of Communism.

== Polish law ==
In legal terminology – as defined by the Article 2.1 of the Journal of Laws (Dziennik Ustaw, DzU) of the Republic of Poland issued 18 December 1998, "communist crimes" constitute crimes committed by the functionaries of the communist apparatus between 17 September 1939 and 31 December 1989. The crimes defined therein form either political repression or direct violation of human rights of an individual or a group; including those, otherwise named in Polish criminal law of that particular time. The concept also covers several other illegal activities prohibited by Polish laws already in place since 1932, such as falsification of documents and using them with the intent to cause harm to people mentioned in them.

The concept of communist crimes was legally introduced in 1998 and revised several times. It was designed to facilitate studies of events and prosecution of people in authority who committed crimes against Polish citizens as well as the Polish state. The definition is conceptually similar to the legal concept of a Nazi crime.

=== Articles 4 to 7 ===
A functionary of a communist state is defined as a public official including those who received legal protection similar to public officials, particularly government officials and leaders of the Communist Party. The functionaries involved would most likely work for Polish intelligence, security service and other internal affairs (particularly censorship and religious affairs) departments. Particular organisations named as examples include Ministry of Public Security of Poland, Służba Bezpieczeństwa and Główny Zarząd Informacji Wojska Polskiego. The communist crimes could have also been committed in Poland by members of foreign civil or military services, such as the KGB, NKVD, SMERSH, and Stasi.

Crimes, recognised by international law as crimes against humanity, crimes against peace, and war crimes, are not affected by the statute of limitations in Poland. Those crimes are not affected either by the former amnesty or abolition decrees issued in communist Poland before 7 December 1989. In case of murders, the Polish statute of limitations begins on 1 August 1990 and runs for 40 years, and for 30 years for other crimes.

The concept has replaced the term Stalinist crime (zbrodnia stalinowska) previously used in Polish law for similar acts, just as the concept of Nazi crime has replaced that of the Hitlerite crime. Both Stalinist and Hitlerite crimes were first defined by Polish legislation in 1991.

While drafting the concept of the communist crime, Polish legislators specifically discarded the notion that a communist crime is equal to a Nazi crime, or that the legislation of the communist crime can be based on that of the Nazi crime (already defined in the legislation of 31 August 1944), as while similar on some levels they are different enough on others to make analogies unacceptable.

Communist crimes are primarily investigated by the Institute of National Remembrance, a special research institute with prosecution powers, created by the same legislation that defined the concept of the communist crime in 1998. Two examples of such unsolved communist crimes are the Augustów roundup and Kąkolewnica massacre, also known as the Baran Forest massacre.

== See also ==
- Decommunization
- Lustration in Poland
- People's Republic of Poland
- The Black Book of Communism
- Thick line (gruba kreska)

== Sources ==
- Communist Crimes (hosted by the Unitas Foundation)
- Kakolewnica Forest Massacre
- "Not Only Katyn" by Ireneusz Sewastianowicz and Stanisław Kulikowski
- The Augustow Roundup
- Hitler vs. Stalin: Who Killed More? by Timothy Snyder
