= Gorohlianyky =

Ukrainian pea fritters

Горохляники
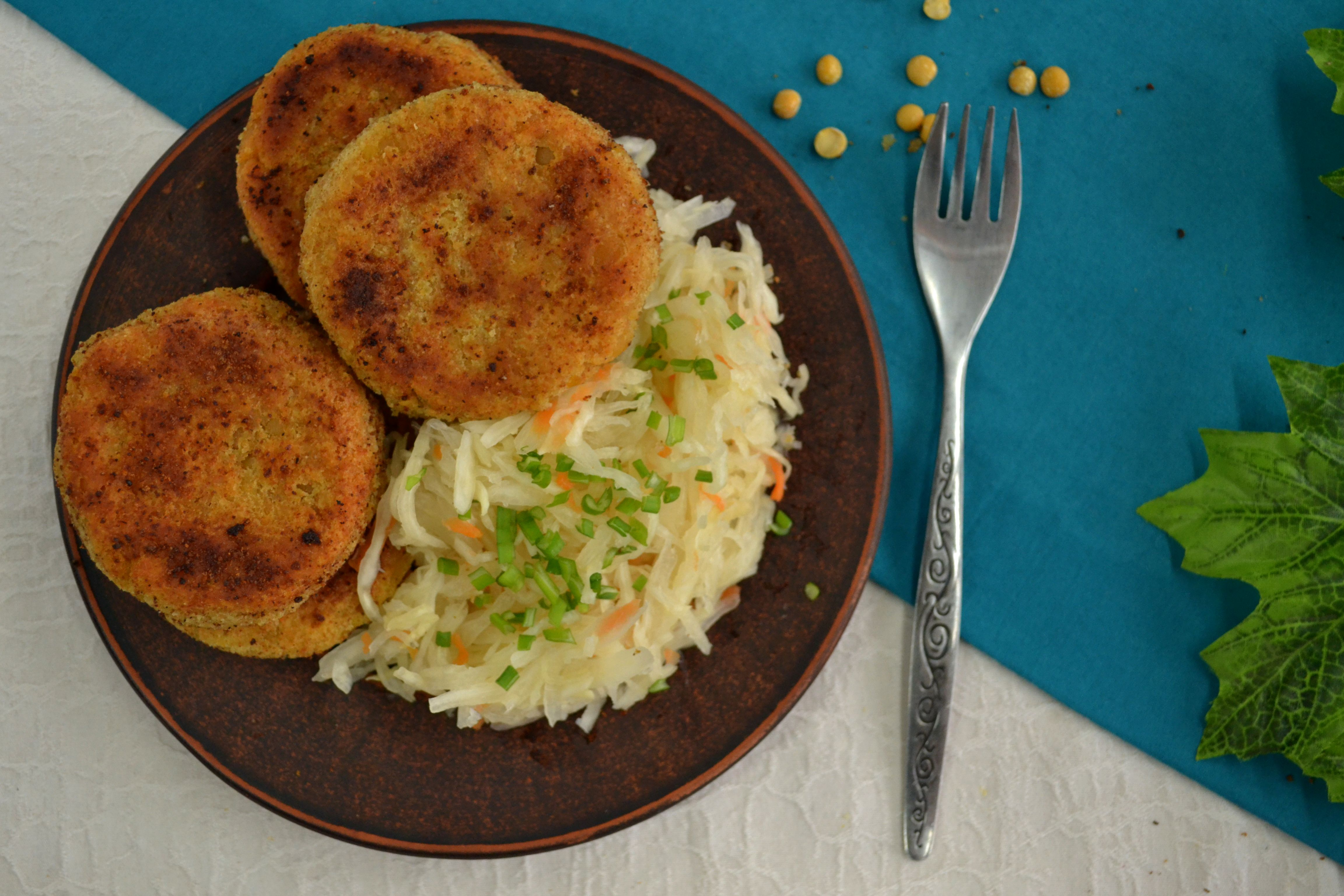
- Type: Pancakes, fritters
- Place of origin: Ukraine
- Serving temperature: hot
- Main ingredients: dried pea, flour, oil, salt, black pepper
- Variations: eggs, fried onions, sugar

Gorohlianyky (Ukrainian: горохляники, also хоми, горохв'яники, горохові котлети), from Ukrainian "goroh", pea) is a traditional Ukrainian dish made from dried pea, a form of fritters or pancakes. The dish was most often prepared during Lent, as well as for the feast of Holy Forty.

== Description ==
Gorohlianyky or gorohvyanyky are made from peas puree. Dry peas are soaked and boiled, then mashed to form a smooth, puréed mass. A 1913 recipe calls for "gorokhvyaniki" made from pea dough: dried peas are ground into flour, which is then kneaded into dough.

Gorokhlyaniki were prepared in two ways: fried or baked.

Two to three tablespoons of wheat or rye flour were added to the pea puree and fried in a well-heated frying pan: with oil during Lent, and with lard during non-fasting days. They were eaten with cracklings, crushed garlic, butter, sour cream, and mushroom sauce. Alternatively, fried onions, sugar and salt and a little flour were added to the pea puree. All of it was mixed, formed into pampushki and baked in the oven. Traditionally, they were served with hemp seed flour.

In modern recipes, an egg is added to the pea puree. This dish is also called pea cutlet.
