= Barran (disambiguation) =

Barran is a commune in France.

Barran may also refer to:

- Barran, Yemen, in the Sanaa Governorate
- Barran Temple, in the Marib Governorate, Yemen
- Barran baronets (United Kingdom)

== People with the surname ==
- Diana Barran, Baroness Barran, British charity campaigner and peer
- John Barran (disambiguation), several people
- Perdita Barran, British scientist
- Peter Barran, (born 1936), Australian footballer
- Petra Barran, British entrepreneur and founder of the London street food collective KERB
- Sir Rowland Barran (1858–1949), English politician

== See also ==
- Baran (disambiguation)
