= John Baron =

John Baron may refer to:

- John Baron (academic) (died 1722), English academic administrator at the University of Oxford
- John Baron (politician) (born 1959), English Member of Parliament
- John Baron (physician) (1786–1851), English physician
- John Baron (priest) (1677–1739), Anglican priest
- John Baron (pseudonym), a pseudonym used by Donald Trump in the 1980s

== See also ==
- John Barron (disambiguation)
- John Barran (disambiguation)
- Jonathan Baron (born 1944), American psychology professor
