= Mościska, Radzyń County =

Mościska
- Village
- Location within Poland
- Coordinates: 51°56′40″N 22°36′30″E
- Country: Poland
- Voivodeship: Lublin
- County: Radzyń
- Gmina: Kąkolewnica Wschodnia
- Population: 250

Mościska [mɔɕˈt͡ɕiska] is a village in the administrative district of Gmina Kąkolewnica Wschodnia, within Radzyń County, Lublin Voivodeship, in eastern Poland.
