= Opole Silesian cuisine =

Style of cooking in Silesia

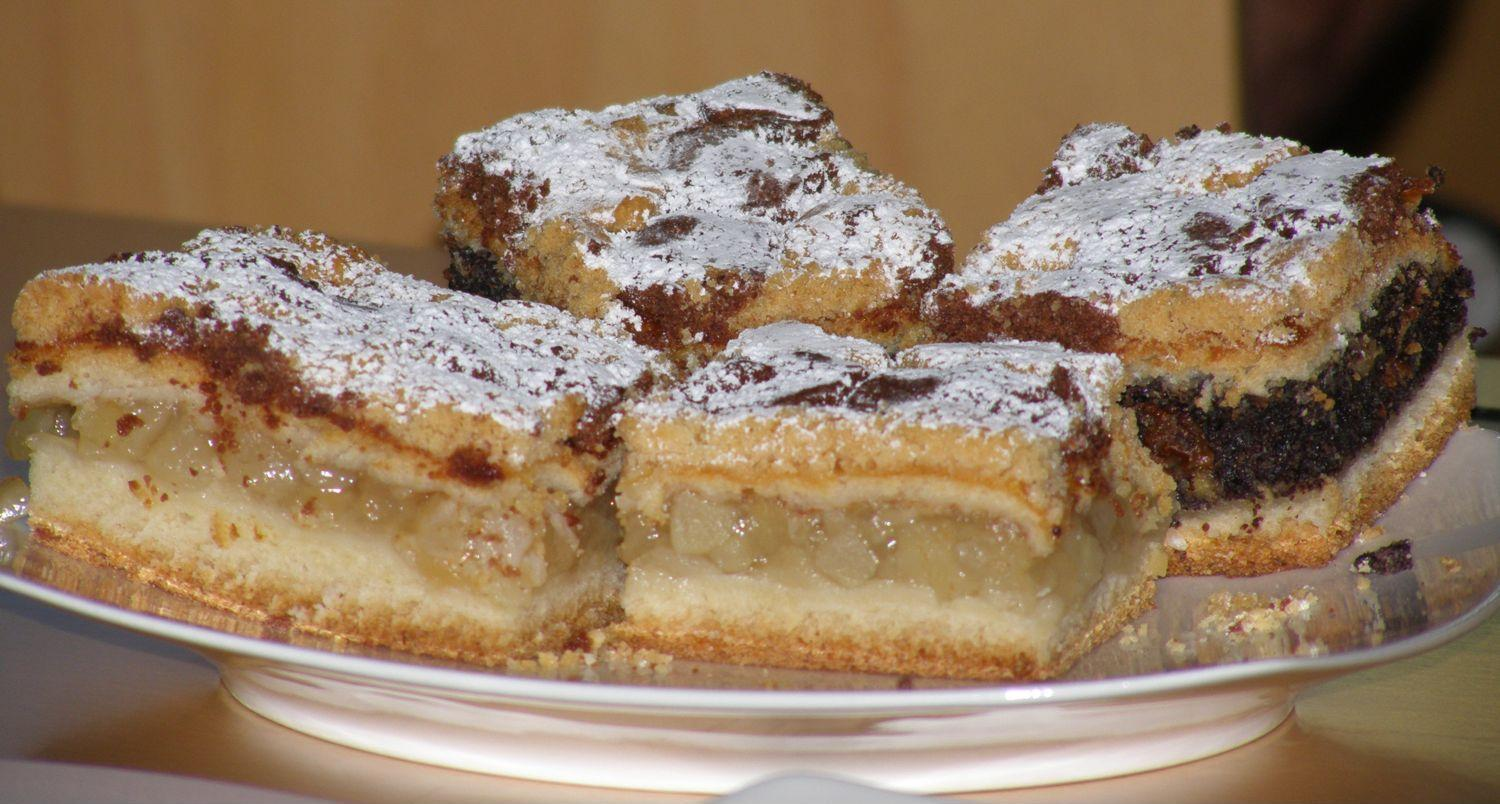
Kołocz śląski

Opole cuisine (Silesian: Ôpolski Kuchyń, Lower Silesian: Uppelner Kiche) is a subgroup of the larger Silesian kitchen, being a style of cooking from the Polish region of Opole, in Silesia. It is a subtype of Silesian, German, and Polish cuisine with many similarities to and influences from neighbouring cuisines.

== List of Opole dishes ==
=== Pastry and baked goods ===
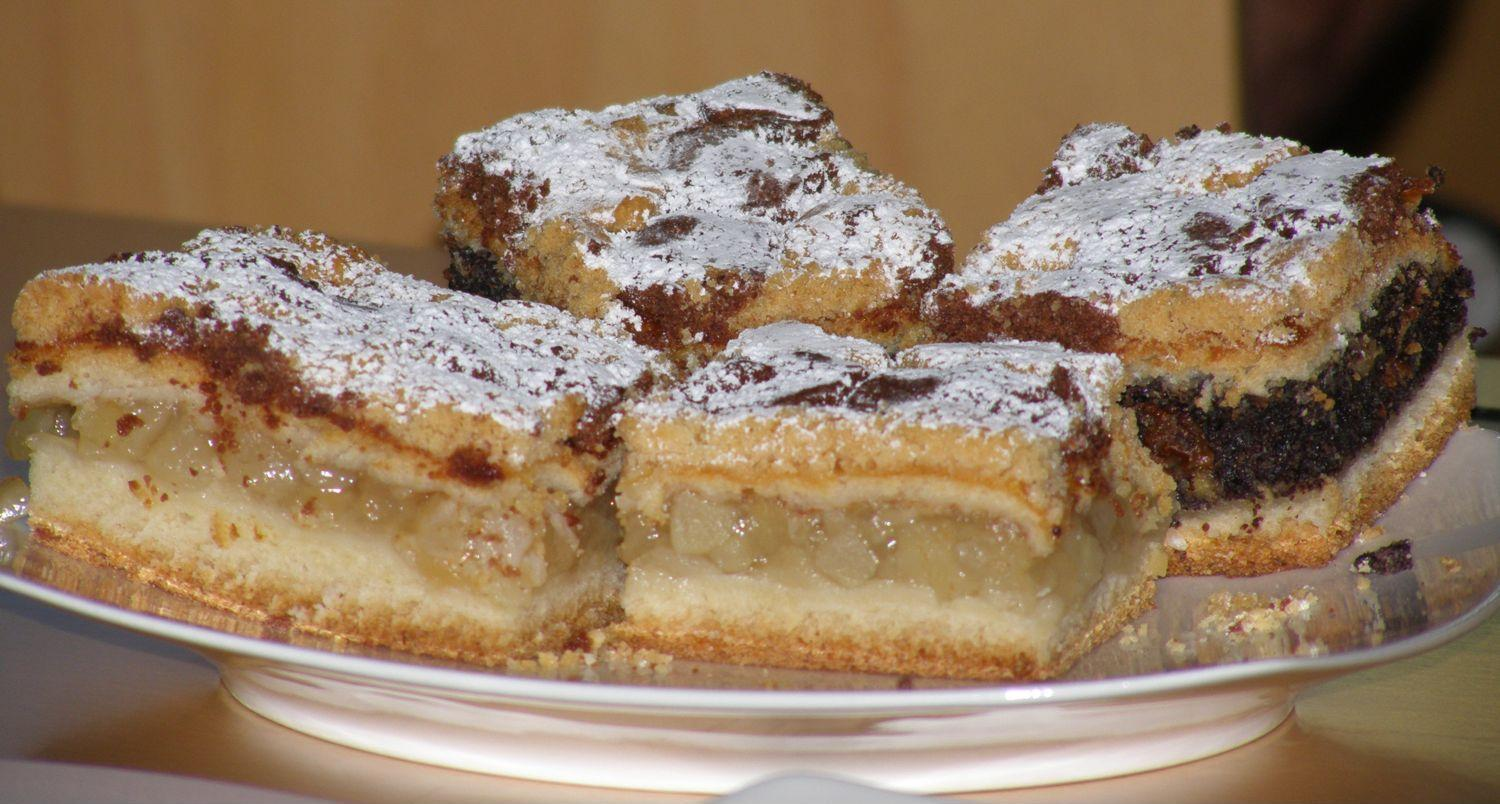
Kołocz śląski

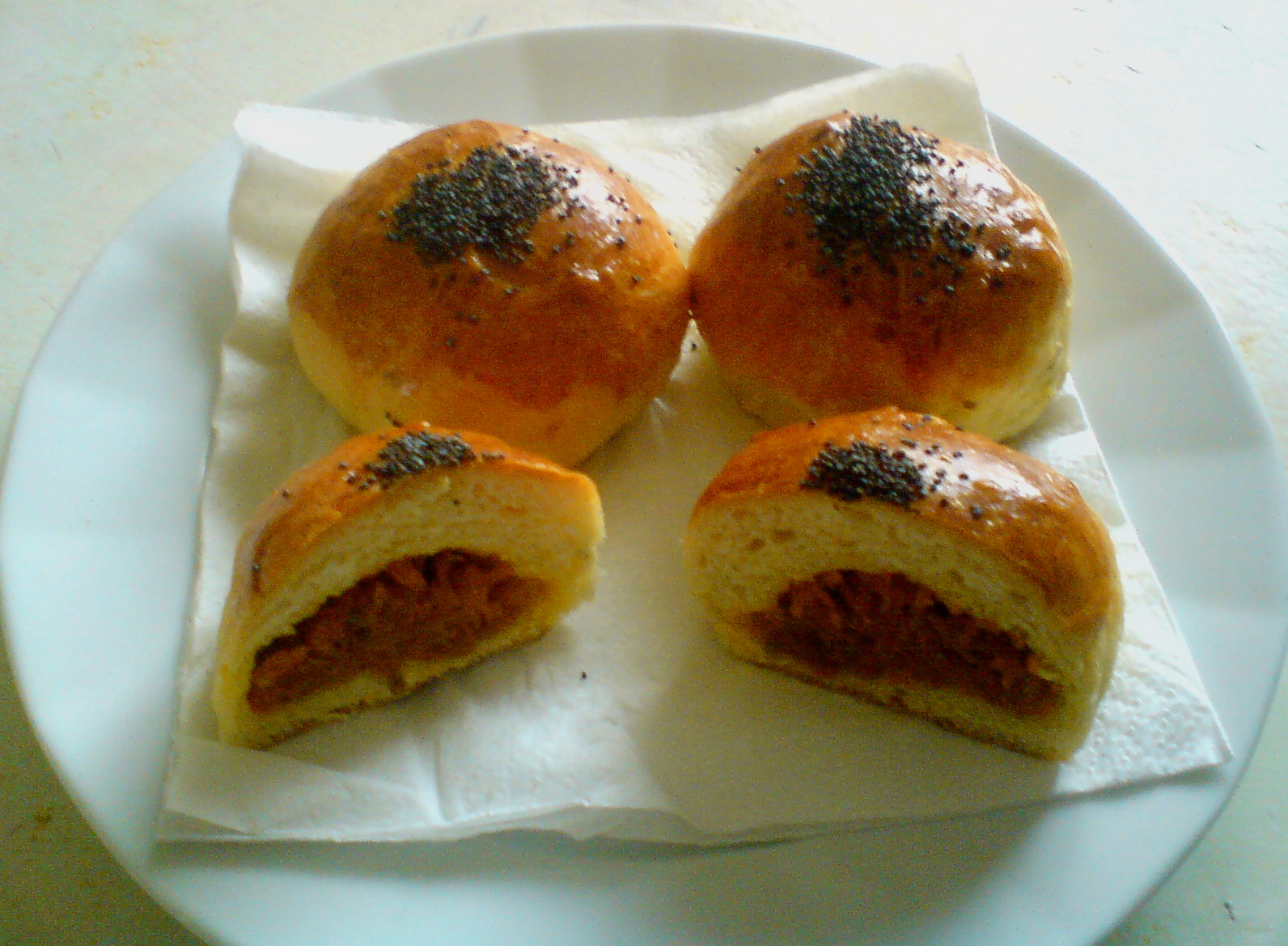
Buchty śląskie

- Anyżki - flat, oval aniseed biscuits
- Chleb mleczny praszkowski (Praszków milk bread) - traditional, slightly sour tasting bread
- Chrust, faworki (angel wings) - traditional sweet crisp pastry, deep-fried, sprinkled with powdered sugar
- Buchty śląskie - unleavened dough pampuchy, traditionally served with berry kompot, powidła, pork, sauerkraut or sugar
- Hałwa sezamowa (sesame halva) - largely unflavoured, sesame based taste
- Kołocz śląski - made from yeast dough with a sweet crumb topping
- Jeż - cake with blackberry cream dollop
- Kretowina - yeast dough cake with chocolate
- Śliszki - bread rolls with poppy-seed filling
- Szpyrek - biscuits with pork fat; light sweet taste

=== Soups ===
- Germuszka, warmuszka, biermuszka - bread, cumin soup of thick texture
- Ścierka opolska - thick flour-egg, sweet-sour tasting soup
- Siemieniotka - bird seed soup
- Śląski żur na maślance (Silesian buttermilk sour rye soup) - sour rye soup with buttermilk
- Wodzionka - stale bread and fat with water or milk

=== Fish dishes ===
- Harynki w cebulowej zołzie (herring in onion sauce) - lightly salted Baltic herring served with sweet-sour onion sauce; may be served with śmietana
- Karp niemodliński (Niemodlin carp) - a slightly sweet-tasting carp

=== Pork and beef dishes ===
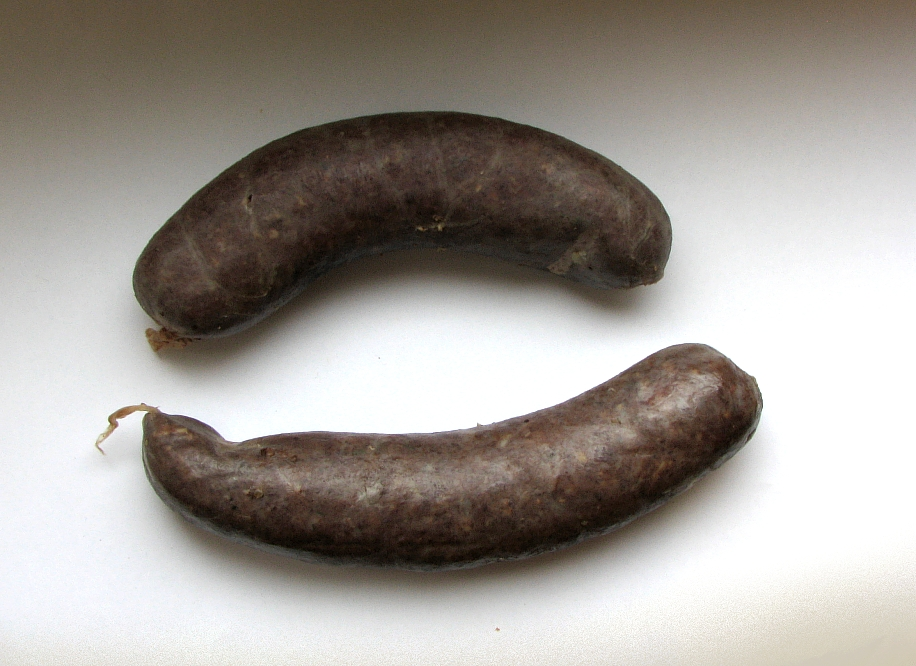
Krupniok śląski

- Żymlok opolski biały (white Opole żymlok) - kaszanka from pork lung, heart or kidney
- Krupniok śląski (Silesian krupniok) - kaszanka; generally with barley-groat stuffing
- Krupnioki z Górek (Górki krupniok) - originated from Górki; a kaszanka, kasza with garlic
- Leberwurst drobno mielony z Górek (liverwurst from Górki) - a liverwurst produced after pig slaughter, spiced with garlic and pepper
- Opolska rolada wołowa (Opole beef rouladen) - a rouladen with baked beef; generally with pickled cucumber, bacon
- Modziki - a pigeon meat based dish, generally served with fresh vegetables

=== Stews, vegetable and potato dishes ===
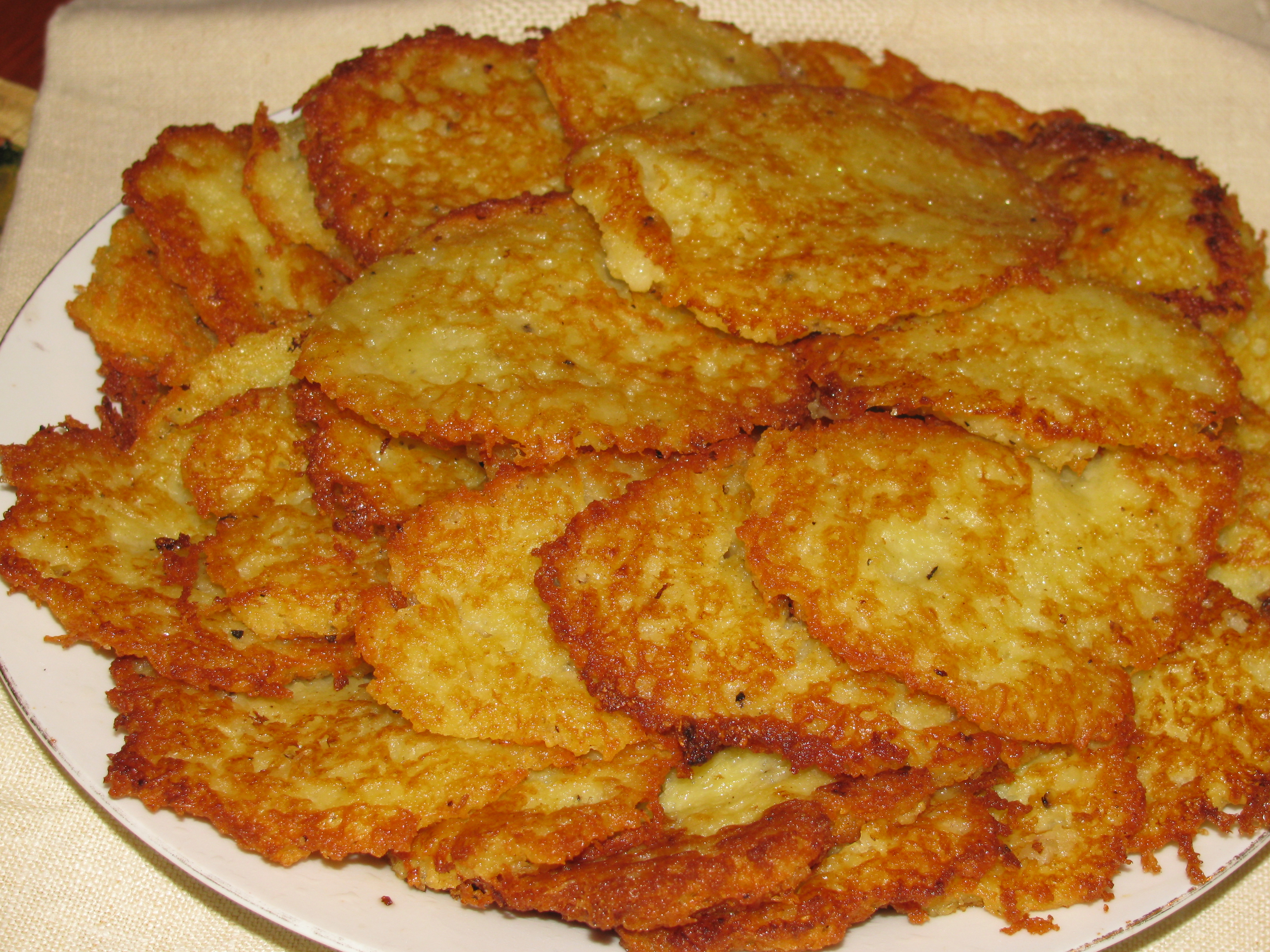
Placki ziemniaczane

- Ciapkapusta, pańczkraut, pańćkraut - potato, cabbage pureé dish
- Pierogi postne ze Starych Kolni (Lent pierogi from Stare Kolnie) - originating from the village of Stare Kolnie; resembling a mid-sized cake, stuffed with groat kasza and potato
- Placki kartoflane (potato pancakes) - round, flat potato pancakes
- Oberiba na gęsto - a thick, turnip-based salad
- Biołe kluski - potato dumplings with a small depression in the centre
- Śląskie niebo - bacon with kluski and sauce, generally with vegetables
- Szałot śląski - potato, cucumber and onion salad

=== Puddings ===
- Mołcka - a traditional Silesian Wigilia viand, made from dried fruit

== See also ==
- List of Polish dishes
- Silesian cuisine
