= Parang (disambiguation) =

Parang is a form of folk music in Venezuela and Trinidad and Tobago.

Parang may also refer to:

== Arts ==
- Parang (batik) – a batik motif originated from Central–Southern Java, Indonesia
- Parang, a 2014 poetry collection by Australian poet Omar Musa

== Places ==
=== Philippines ===
- Parang, Jose Panganiban – Jose Panganiban
- Parang, Maguindanao del Norte – a municipality in the province of Maguindanao del Norte, Philippines
- Parang – in Marikina
- Parang, Sulu

=== Other places ===
- Parâng Mountains group – in the Southern Carpathians, Romania.

== Other uses ==
- Parang (knife), a type of machete originated from Central–Southern Java, Indonesia.

== See also ==
- Farang
- Barang (disambiguation)
- Parangtritis – a district of Bantul Regency in Yogyakarta, Indonesia
