= Olszewnica, Gmina Kąkolewnica Wschodnia =

Olszewnica
- Village
- Location within Poland
- Coordinates: 51°55′N 22°35′E
- Country: Poland
- Voivodeship: Lublin
- County: Radzyń
- Gmina: Kąkolewnica Wschodnia

Population
  - Total: 630
- Time zone: UTC+1 (CET)
  - Summer (DST): UTC+2 (CEST)

Olszewnica [ɔlʂɛvˈnit͡sa] is a village in the administrative district of Gmina Kąkolewnica Wschodnia, within Radzyń County, Lublin Voivodeship, in eastern Poland.

== History ==
15 Polish citizens were murdered by Nazi Germany in the village during World War II.
