= Lipniaki =

- Village
- Location within Poland
- Coordinates: 51°54′00″N 22°36′00″E
- Country: Poland
- Voivodeship: Lublin
- County: Radzyń
- Gmina: Kąkolewnica Wschodnia

Lipniaki [lipˈɲaki] is a village in the administrative district of Gmina Kąkolewnica Wschodnia, within Radzyń County, Lublin Voivodeship, in eastern Poland.
