= Miłolas =

- Village
- Location within Poland
- Coordinates: 51°53′35″N 22°38′59″E
- Country: Poland
- Voivodeship: Lublin
- County: Radzyń
- Gmina: Kąkolewnica Wschodnia
- Population: 18

Miłolas [miˈwɔlas] is a village in the administrative district of Gmina Kąkolewnica Wschodnia, within Radzyń County, Lublin Voivodeship, in eastern Poland.
