= Polskowola =

- Village
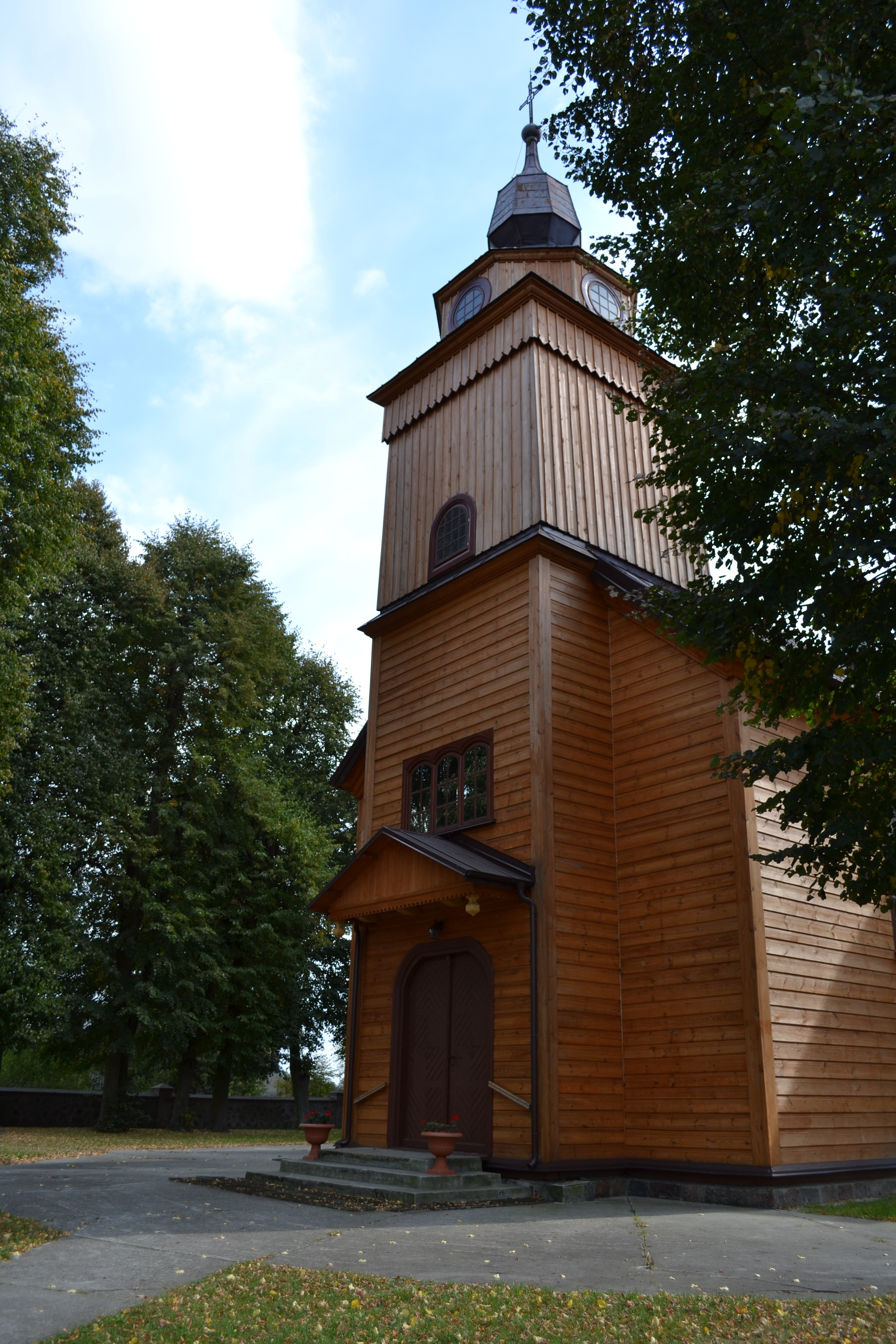
- Saint John the Evangelist church in Polskowola

- Location within Poland
- Coordinates: 51°56′N 22°40′E
- Country: Poland
- Voivodeship: Lublin
- County: Radzyń
- Gmina: Kąkolewnica Wschodnia

Population
  - Total: 900
- Time zone: UTC+1 (CET)
  - Summer (DST): UTC+2 (CEST)
- Website: www.polskowola.pl

Polskowola [pɔlskɔˈvɔla] is a village in the administrative district of Gmina Kąkolewnica Wschodnia, within Radzyń County, Lublin Voivodeship, in eastern Poland.

== History ==
Six Polish citizens were murdered by Nazi Germany in the village during World War II.
