= Pampuchy =

Polish steamed yeast dumpling

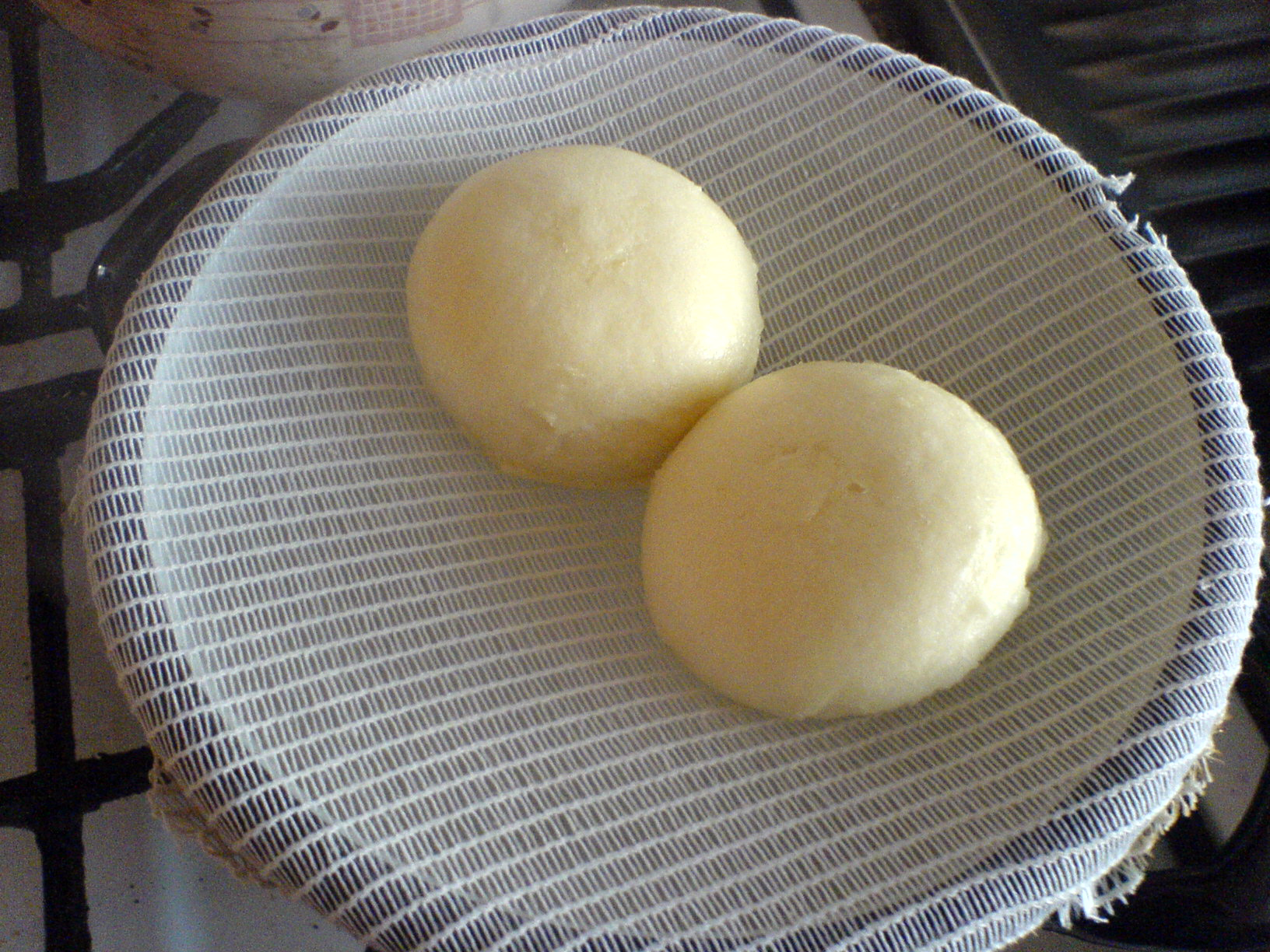
- Pampuchy whilst steamed
- Alternative names: Pączki, bułki, kluski na parze, pyzy drożdżowe, kluski parowe, parzaki, parowańce, parowce, buchty
- Type: Dumpling
- Course: Appetizer, main, dessert
- Place of origin: Poland
- Serving temperature: Hot
- Main ingredients: Yeast dough

Pampuchy ([pampuxɨ]; see alternative names) are a type of steamed yeast dumpling (kluski) or doughnut (pączek) in Polish cuisine. A cooked pampuch (sing.) has an oval, flat on the bottom shape, with a bouncy, mushy and soft consistency. Pampuchy or bułki na parze are served hot: either sweet (e.g. with jam or fruit) or savoury (e.g. with sauce or with the addition of meat).

Prepared, uncooked pampuchy can be generally bought in most grocery shops in Poland.

== Etymology ==
The Polish term pampuch comes from the German Pfannkuchen ('pancake'), which in turn derives from Pfanne ('pan') and Kuchen ('cake') similarly to English 'pancake'. Pampukh, a type of Ukrainian bun or doughnut, derives its name from pampuch.

== Regional variations ==
=== Kuyavia ===
The Kuyavian variation, named bułki na parze/pampuchy z Kujaw, is a protected product under geographical indications and traditional specialities in the European Union.

Traditionally, the dish was served on the daily Kuyavian-Pomeranian home dinner table as a main meal or snack. Generally it is served with sauce, as a savoury dish, or sweet with sour cream and sugar or with fruit.

=== Lublin Land ===
The following pampuchy variations are found on the Polish Ministry of Agriculture and Rural Development's List of Traditional Products:

- Parowańce z kaszą jaglaną (parowańce with millet kasza)—originated from the surroundings of the village of Kąkolewnica in Lublin Voivodeship. A pyzy-type dish with a light millet kasza filling.
- Parowańce brzozowickie z kapustą i grzybami (Brzozowice parowańce with cabbage and mushrooms)—originated from the village of Brzozowica Mała, Gmina Kąkolewnica. A kluski-type dish with a light wild mushroom and cabbage filling.
- Parowańce z serem (parowańce with cheese)—originated from the village of Kąkolewnica, Lublin Voivodeship. A pyzy-type dish with a light white cheese filling.
- Parowańce żakowolskie z soczewicą (Żakowala parowańce with lentils)—originated from the village of Żakowola Poprzeczna. A light savoury pyzy dish with a ground lentil filling, with added fried onion.

=== Greater Poland ===
In Poznań Land (Poznań dialect: kluchy na łachu, parowce, kluchy z łacha, kluchy na lumpie) the dough is made from yeast sourdough (yeast dough with a small amount of added milk, flour, sugar and salt), which is thereafter mixed with the relevant dough ingredients (flour, eggs and milk). Margarine is added to the kneaded dough. The cooking pot is then lined with a small cloth, onto which small oval-shaped dough balls are placed, then covered and cooked for approximately 20 minutes. Traditionally, cooked pampuchy are served with red cabbage and baked duck with apples. The aforesaid dish is a traditional, festive dish in Poznań cuisine.

In the Kalisz Region the dough for pyzy, parówki or pampuchy is made from millet yeast with the addition of milk, sugar, flour, eggs, butter and salt. Traditionally these are served with pork chops and sweet-sour fried white cabbage, or stuffed with fruit and melted butter, sugar and cinnamon.

=== Upper Silesia ===
In Upper Silesia (buchty, as in "buchty cake") pampuchy are traditionally served with berry kompot (blackberries), powidła, pork, sauerkraut, or topped with melted butter and sprinkled with sugar.

The Opole Silesia variation, named buchty śląskie, czyli kluski drożdżowe gotowane na parze ('Silesian buchty', or 'steamed yeast dumplings'), since March 6, 2007 is found on the Polish Ministry of Agriculture and Rural Development's List of Traditional Products.

== See also ==
- Pyzy
- Knedle
