= Żakowola Poprzeczna =

- Village
- Location within Poland
- Coordinates: 51°53′N 22°42′E
- Country: Poland
- Voivodeship: Lublin
- County: Radzyń
- Gmina: Kąkolewnica Wschodnia

Żakowola Poprzeczna [ʐakɔˈvɔla pɔˈpʂɛt͡ʂna] is a village in the administrative district of Gmina Kąkolewnica Wschodnia, within Radzyń County, Lublin Voivodeship, in eastern Poland.

== See also ==
- Lublin Land cuisine
