= Grabowiec, Radzyń County =

Grabowiec
- Village
- Location within Poland
- Coordinates: 51°56′N 22°42′E
- Country: Poland
- Voivodeship: Lublin
- County: Radzyń
- Gmina: Kąkolewnica Wschodnia
- Population: 530

Grabowiec [ɡraˈbɔvjɛt͡s] is a village in the administrative district of Gmina Kąkolewnica Wschodnia, within Radzyń County, Lublin Voivodeship, in eastern Poland.
