= Nazi crime =

Polish legal concept

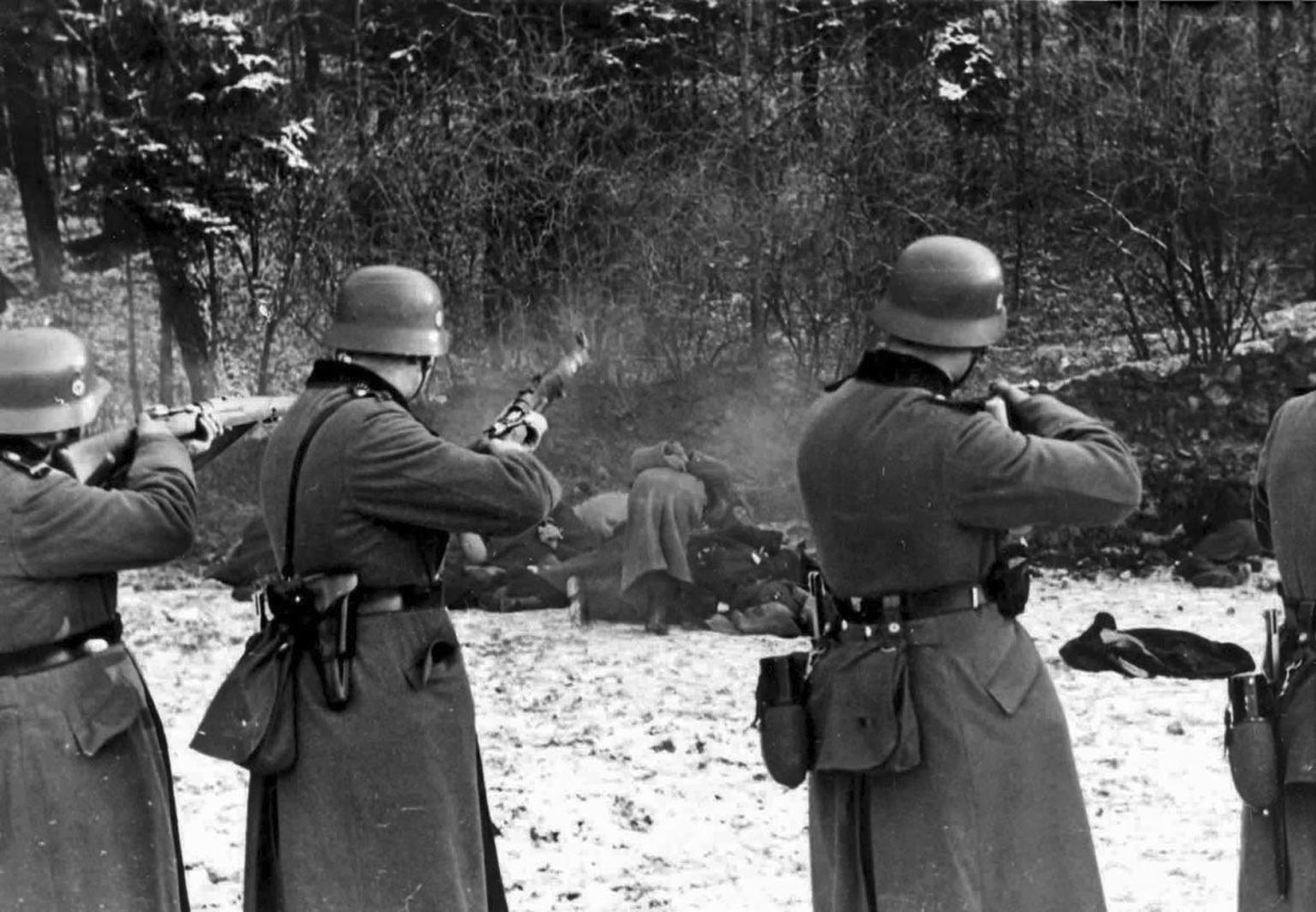
Wehrmacht soldiers shooting Polish civilians in a reprisal, Bochnia, December 1939

Nazi crime or Hitlerite crime (Polish: zbrodnia nazistowska or zbrodnia hitlerowska) is a legal concept used in the Polish legal system, referring to an action which was carried out, inspired, or tolerated by public functionaries of Nazi Germany (1933–1945) that is also classified as a crime against humanity (in particular, genocide) or other persecutions of people due to their membership in a particular national, political, social, ethnic or religious group.

Nazi crimes in Poland were perpetrated against tens of millions of Polish people and caused the deaths of millions, especially Jews, members of the resistance, Romani people, socialists, and homosexuals. Millions of non-Polish Holocaust victims and Soviet prisoners of war were also subjected to Nazi atrocities after being brought to Poland.

The definition of zbrodnia nazistowska also covers destruction of property, such as the destruction of Warsaw.

== Types of crimes ==
=== Physical crimes ===
The crimes which were committed during the Holocaust included physical crimes. In Ukraine, an estimated 400,000 Jewish people were killed in Nazi concentration camps during the Holocaust. On average per day about 1,864 Jewish people died. Most of the people who were murdered during the Holocaust never received proper burials. Ukraine has over 750 mass graves where groups of five or more Jewish people were marched into mass pits and shot in the back. 5,000 Jews were marched from Ukraine into these pits. To save bullets children would be thrown into pits of fire to be burned alive.

The physical crimes which the Nazis committed also included "criminal assault on innocent and helpless victims" and victims were "beaten, drowned, whipped, shot, ran over, strangled and gassed." These crimes included sexual crimes or crimes that "were directed at women's genitalia." Another 'popular' way the Nazis murdered people was to have them euthanized. The Nazi crimes also included genocide.

=== Property crimes ===
The Nazis permitted the commission of different crimes including property crimes and crimes against classes of people. The Nazis took away all of the Jews' possessions and incomes in order to make it harder for the Jewish people to live elsewhere before the onset of the Holocaust. The victims of the Holocaust were described by the Nazis as "criminals who endangered public safety". The central Nazi camp for Jews between 1940 and 1945 was Auschwitz; where "at least ten thousand POWs were murdered". Gypsies, as well as Jews and gays were murdered in this concentration camp. "Most of those who entered the Nazi camp system, whether gay, Jewish, Roma, or Sinti, or black did not survive".

There were some individuals who excelled at carrying out Nazi crimes. Oswald Kaduk was notorious for his extermination practices because of the torture he committed on prisoners in Auschwitz. One of the torture techniques which he used was to "put a cane over a prisoner's neck and he stood on it until the prisoner died." He also would randomly shoot into a group of prisoners "killing whoever got in the way". Many people would do what the German troops ordered them to do in order to keep their families alive. One Jewish man became a policeman in the ghetto where he lived and he later partook in its destruction because he was told that if he did so, his wife and daughter would live. His wife and daughter later died because they were forced into a gas chamber.

== Nazi hearings ==
Following the conclusion of World War II, Nazis were charged with crimes in many different court hearings. Important changes were made to the Control Council Law No. 10 by the Allies because "German jurists exerted pressure on the Allies in order to prevent national or district courts from using Control Council Law No. 10." The changes allowed the Allies to deal with "war crimes, conspiracy to commit war crimes, crimes against peace, and crimes against humanity".

German law allowed the death penalty to be imposed for crimes other than murder if they also resulted in the death of the victim. "Most of the mass killings committed in the Political Department at Auschwitz followed some sort of regulated procedure. The murder and torture of children would get a murder conviction due to 'malicious intent'". For a case to be a 'murder case', the only criteria that needed to be present were "thirst for blood, base motives, maliciousness, and brutality which come into question in connection with the prosecution of Nazi war crimes". Along with these criteria, "lust for killing and sadism" were also needed in order to ensure successful prosecutions. When charging a person who was assumed to be responsible for murder, a common question the courts asked the accused was whether excessive cruelty and the maltreatment of prisoners led to their deaths. If not, "the punishment of these people would not have a high priority" for the case to be pursued publicly.

"Defendants who had acted on their own initiative or who had shown base motives or excessive cruelty were murderers: many who had not exhibited such behavior (or against whom sufficient evidence of such behavior was lacking) were judged guilty of manslaughter according to the German Penal Code. Many people who had murdered a Jew or a Gypsy during the Holocaust were charged with "merely aiding and abetting murder"."

== See also ==
- Communist crime
- Nazi crimes against the Polish nation
- Nuremberg Trials
- Pursuit of Nazi collaborators
- The Holocaust
