= Kąkolewnica =

- Village
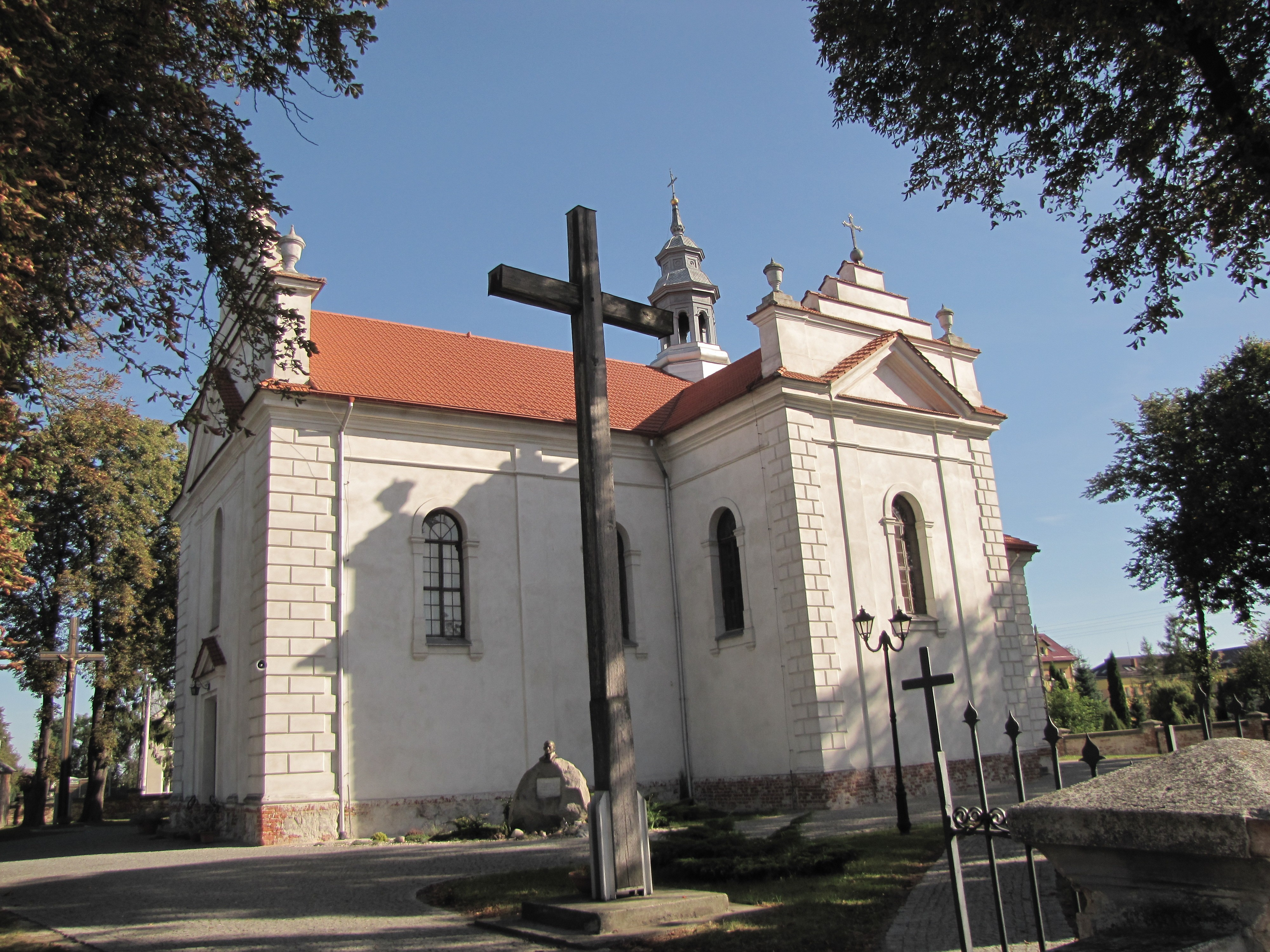
- Church of Saint Philip Neri

- Location within Poland
- Coordinates: 51°56′N 22°43′E
- Country: Poland
- Voivodeship: Lublin
- County: Radzyń
- Gmina: Kąkolewnica Wschodnia

Population
  - Total: 680

Kąkolewnica [kɔnkɔlɛvˈnit͡sa] is a village in Radzyń County, Lublin Voivodeship, in eastern Poland. It is the seat of the gmina (administrative district) called Gmina Kąkolewnica.

Kąkolewnica became a unified village on 1 January 2011, formed from the formerly separate villages of Kąkolewnica Północna, Kąkolewnica Południowa, Kąkolewnica Wschodnia (north, south and east Kąkolewnica) and Rudnik.

== World War II history ==
Kąkolewnica was the location of the communist killing fields at Uroczysko Baran – known in Poland as the "Little Katyn" – perpetrated during the advancement of the Red Army across the Polish territories in 1944–1945.

== See also ==
- Lublin Land cuisine
