= Zosinowo =

- Village
- Location within Poland
- Coordinates: 51°52′N 22°39′E
- Country: Poland
- Voivodeship: Lublin
- County: Radzyń
- Gmina: Kąkolewnica Wschodnia
- Population: 75
- Postal code: 21-302
- Area code: 83

Zosinowo [zɔɕiˈnɔvɔ] is a village in the administrative district of Gmina Kąkolewnica Wschodnia, within Radzyń County, Lublin Voivodeship, in eastern Poland.
