= Żakowola Stara =

- Village
- Location within Poland
- Coordinates: 51°52′17″N 22°43′39″E
- Country: Poland
- Voivodeship: Lublin
- County: Radzyń
- Gmina: Kąkolewnica Wschodnia

Żakowola Stara [ʐakɔˈvɔla ˈstara] is a village in the administrative district of Gmina Kąkolewnica Wschodnia, within Radzyń County, Lublin Voivodeship, in eastern Poland.
