= Barang =

Barang may refer to:

- Barang (Khmer word) ('French')
- Barang (magic), a malevolent use of sympathetic magic by Filipino witches
- Barang Junction railway station, Cuttack, India
- Barang Subdivision, Khyber Pakhtunkhwa, Pakistan
- Barang-e Bozorg ('Greater Barang'), a village in Bushehr Province, Iran
- Barang-e Kuchak ('Lesser Barang'), a village in Bushehr Province, Iran

== See also ==
- Farang
- Baran (disambiguation)
- Parang (disambiguation)
- Barang-Barang language, a variety of Laiyolo
