= Borran =

Borran may refer to:

- Borran District, Iran
- Borran Rural District, Iran
- Borran-e Olya, Iran
- Borran-e Sofla, Iran
- Buraan, Somalia
- Borås, Sweden
