= List of Dragon Quest: The Adventure of Dai characters =

This is a list of characters for the manga series Dragon Quest: The Adventure of Dai and its two anime adaptations. The manga ran in Weekly Shonen Jump from 1989 to 1996 and the first anime series aired from 1991 to 1992, covering the first 10 volumes of the manga, while the second one aired from 2020 to 2022 and covered the entire series, both produced by Toei Animation.

== Main characters ==
=== Dai ===
Voiced by: Toshiko Fujita (1991), Atsumi Tanezaki (2020) (Japanese); Sabrina Pitre (2020) (English)

12-years old, Dai (ダイ) grew up as the only human on Dermline island. He gains some fame after defeating a group of fake heroes who had kidnapped his friend Gome and protecting Princess Leona from some assassins. When the Dark Lord Hadlar is resurrected, the previous hero, Avan, comes to help train him to become the next hero. Dai possesses the ability to gain enhanced strength and a better control of magic when the emblem of the dragon appears on his body, which is a mark of the Dragon Knight's lineage, later discovering that his original name was Dino, son of the Dragon Knight Baran. Dai managed to learn the Earth and Wave Slashes with Avan, but had to acquire the Sky Slash on his own. Notably, Dai can infuse his weapon with elemental magic to create more powerful sword techniques. He can do the same thing with his Draconic Aura, but ordinary weapons cannot take the strain; Hyunckel's Demon Magic Sword breaks after Dai performs a crest-assisted Avan Strash. To suit this ability, Dai acquires an orichalcum sword from the legendary swordsmith Lon Berk, which can take the pressure. After Baran's death, Dai inherits his father's mark and all of his exclusive abilities, along the combat experience of all his Dragon Knight predecessors. He also learns to use the power of both crests together, doubling his attack power.

=== Popp ===
Voiced by: Keiichi Nanba (1991), Toshiyuki Toyonaga (2020) (Japanese); Cole Howard (2020) (English)

The son of the weapons merchant Junk, 15-year-old Popp (ポップ, Popu) left his home in Lankarks village and decided to become an apprentice of Avan, training to become a magician. Coward and lazy at first, he slowly changes for the better after befriending Dai and the others. He is a specialist in fire spells, mainly those of the Sizz type, but as the story progresses he learns more powerful spells such as a gravity pressure attack. He can use Kamikazee and Crack type spells as well. Later on in the series, Popp becomes a Sage, one of the highest class of magicians who can use both attack and healing spells. Throughout the series, Popp uses various weapons, but later on in the series he acquires a staff from Lon Berk with the same power that rivals Vearn's staff, the ability to turn magic power into attack power, along with his signature spell, Frizz Cracker (メドローア, Medoroa), after training with Matoriv. In addition to this, Pop's staff can transform to any shape.

=== Maam ===
Voiced by: Miina Tominaga (1991), Mikako Komatsu (2020) (Japanese); Diana Kaarina (2020) (English)

16-years old, Maam (マァム, Maamu) is the daughter of Leyra and Loca, the priestess and warrior who helped Avan in the original fight against Hadlar. Maam trained under Avan and is proficient with healing spells (such as Heal), but never could successfully learn any offensive ones. Avan gave her a magical gun that shoots magic spells, which helped her compensate for her lack of expertise with any of the other schools of magic. When the gun gets destroyed she decides to change to another class, fighter, and temporarily leaves the party to train under Brokeena, known as the God of Martial Arts. Under Brokeena, Maam learns her ultimate technique: the refractor fist, an attack that uses healing magic to break down the enemy's body by overloading their regeneration process. Later on in the series, Maam acquires a transforming armor weapon from Lon Berk, which allows her to increase the destructive power of her techniques.

=== Leona ===
Voiced by: Aya Hisakawa (1991), Saori Hayami (2020) (Japanese); Kelly Sheridan (2020) (English)

14-years old, Leona (レオナ, Reona) is the princess of Papnica. She is training to be a sage and is well-versed in the magic arts. Her country comes to near destruction after the return of Hadlar by the hands of Hyunckel, whom she forgives and sentences to become a "true disciple of Avan". Her father is missing and presumed dead, leaving her in control of rebuilding her kingdom and helping in the fight against the Ultimate Demon King. She is friends with Dai, although it is hinted Dai feels something more for her. Leona is proficient in both Sizz-type spells and Crack-type spells; however she is best at healing spells such as Fullheal, which she uses effectively in the fight against Baran. Despite she was never a student by Avan's, later on in the series, she becomes an official member of Avan's disciples when she inherits the 5th mark of Avan from the Queen of Carl, Flora.

=== Hyunckel ===
Voiced by: Hideyuki Hori (1991), Yuki Kaji (2020) (Japanese); Vincent Tong (2020) (English)

21-years old, Hyunckel (ヒュンケル, Hyunkeru) was raised by monsters after his parents were killed in a monster attack. When Avan killed Hadlar and Hyunckel finds his adoptive father dead, he secretly holds a grudge against Avan, whom he believes killed his father. Hyunckel then becomes Avan's first pupil but, after graduating, unsuccessfully tried to kill his teacher with a technique he invented himself, Bloody Scraid. He was then taken in by Mystvearn who brought him up to become General of the Immortal Army, one of the six main armies under Hadlar and Vearn's control, known as "Leader of the Undead Knights Hyunckel". After discovering that Hadlar had killed his adopted father instead of Avan, he joins Dai's party. Hyunckel originally used a demon magic sword that could transform into armor (Amudo), but it is broken when Dai fought Baran. Thereafter, Hyunckel has been using a spear with the same properties and created by the same person. Hyunckel can use all the basic Avan techniques also in addition to Demon Puppet Grab. Due to changing his weapon from a sword to a spear, he had to learn Avan's elemental techniques for spears.

== Supporting characters ==
=== Avan De Zinuar III ===
Voiced by: Hideyuki Tanaka (1991), Takahiro Sakurai (2020) (Japanese); Vincent Tong (2020) (English)

31-years old, Avan De Zinuar III (アバン = デ = ジニュアール3世, Aban De Jiniuaaru Sansei) was the previous hero who defeated the Demon King Hadlar. When he was younger, he befriended princess Flora, the ruler of the kingdom of Carl, and Loca, the general of Carl's army. He usually spent time goofing around while wearing thick glasses to hide his true power from everyone. When Hadlar tried to murder Flora, Avan decided not to hide anymore and protected her and the whole kingdom from the Demon King. After temporarily defeating him, he embarks on a journey with Loca where he would meet with Leyra, Maam's mother, and Matoriv, a powerful magician to finish off Hadlar for good. After their victory, he decided to become a trainer for a future generation of heroes. When Hadlar is resurrected and comes to defeat him, Avan casts the self-sacrifice spell Kamikazee to protect Dai, Brass and Popp. It is later revealed that Avan had worn a protective talisman (given to him by Flora) that saved his life from the effects of Kamikazee by taking the damage on his behalf. Having survived, he then chose to level up to be of more use to Dai and his other students in their fight against Vearn. In the end of the series, Avan marries Flora and becomes the king of Carl.

=== Brass ===
Voiced by: Junpei Takiguchi (1991 film), Isamu Tanonaka (1991), Kenichi Ogata (2020) (Japanese); Alec Willows (2020) (English)

Brass (ブラス, Burasu) is a Dai's adoptive grandfather. He is a monster that belonged to The Demon Lord's Army but, after Hadlar died, lived in peace along with the other surviving monsters on the Dermline island. He picked up Dai from a shipwreck that came to the island when he was a child and raised him. He is unable to leave the island due to the influence of The Dark King Vearn, as he would turn into an evil monster by leaving the magic barrier that Avan created. He participated against his will in Crocodine's fight against Dai. He would be rescued from this trap by Popp and return to the island.

=== Gome ===
Voiced by: Yumi Touma (1991), Ai Furihata (2020) (Japanese); Michelle Molineux (2020) (English)

Gome (ゴメ), also known as "Gomechan", is a one-of-a-kind creature, a Golden Metal Slime. Dai's first friend, Gome is immune to the Dark Lord's influence unlike other monsters, thus he leaves the island with Dai to accompany him in his adventures. Capable of producing small miracles throughout the story that help Dai and his friends, in the end it is revealed that Gome is a wish-granting item created by God to help pure-hearted people.

=== Crocodine ===
Voiced by: Banjou Ginga (1991), Tomoaki Maeno (2020) (Japanese); Jason Simpson (2020) (English)

30-years old, Crocodine (クロコダイン, Kurokodain) is a massive anthropomorphic crocodile who used to be the known as "Beast King Crocodine", general of the Hundred Beasts Army. After having been defeated by Dai and Popp's teamwork, he is inspired by Popp's courage and joins the party. He has many beasts still under his control, despite Hadlar's influence throughout the world. He has a powerful weapon called the "Void Axe", which allows him to cast Whoosh, one of the two wind spells available. He later acquires an even more powerful axe from the legendary swordsmith Lon Berk when the Void Axe is destroyed in the first fight with Vearn.

=== Matoriv ===
Voiced by: Shin Aomori (1991), Kazuhiro Yamaji (2020)

Matoriv (マトリフ, Matorifu) is a perverted old sorcerer who fought on Avan's side in the previous war. He later worked as an advisor to the king of Papnica, but found his time there unpleasant because his colleagues harassed him repeatedly, which he attributed to jealousy of his abilities. Becoming disillusioned with people for their selfishness, he left office and decided to live in isolation, before the heroes first met him in the main story. Reluctantly, he agrees to help the heroes again and trains Popp. He will be a great teacher for the latter, to whom he will transmit all his most powerful techniques and help him to bring out his potential, making him understand that if he can always fight with the concentration he shows in the most desperate cases, then he will become very powerful.

=== Baran ===
Voiced by: Unshou Ishizuka (1991), Show Hayami (2020) (Japanese); Dean Redman (2020) (English)

The commander of the Super Dragon Brigade and Dai's biological father, Baran (バラン) is a fierce fighter with strong morals. He is the true Dragon Knight of the era and in his youth he defeated Velther. After the fight he was mortally wounded and would have died if not for the help of Soara, the princess of Alkeed who nursed him back to health. The two fell in love, but when her father the king discovered that Baran was not human he was thrown out of the castle (after being accused of being a follower of a demon) only to be followed by Soara, who announced to him that she was pregnant. Some months later, Baran and Soara lived happy and without concerns, taking care of baby Dai (whom they named Dino). When the king found the two, Baran voluntarily gave himself up to protect his wife and child. He was brought back to Alkeed and sentenced to death. When Baran was to be executed with fire spells, Soara jumped in the way to protect him and was fatally wounded. Soara's father claimed her to be a disgrace, and in a rage Baran destroyed the entire kingdom of Alkeed. He then desperately tried to search for his son but was unable to find Dai. Having lost his wife and his child by the hands of humans, whom he was tasked to protect, he decided that all humans should be exterminated. He was later reunited with Dai as enemies. Upon seeing Dai's dragon knight symbol, he realized that he is his son and wipes Dai's memories. He tried to persuade Dai to join him but Dai refused to believe he is Baran's son. Popp sacrifices himself to return Dai's memories during the second time they fight, but fails to scratch Baran with Kamikazee. Later, Baran joins with Dai to fight against Vearn but is killed when he shields Dai from the explosion of a Black Core Crystal when fighting Hadlar. Baran has a high mastery of his crest and can transform into a Ryuumajin, the ultimate form of a Dragon Knight, which is a combination of a demon, human, and dragon. In this form, he is unable to discern between friend and foe until everything is dead. He also has Giga Break (a powerful move utilizing the ultimate electricity spell, Kazap ("Gigadein" in Japan), and his legendary sword, the Demon Dragon Blade), Zap-type magic, and Draconic Aura. Baran's ultimate spell is Draura (Dragon Touki Cannon). This spell channels Draconic Aura into a cannon blast that can annihilate a whole country, and can only be used in his Ryuumajin form.

=== Aimi ===
Voiced by: Yumi Tōma (1991), Yui Ishikawa (2020)

Aimi (エイミ, Eimi) is a sage alongside her older twin sister, Marin and their leader, Apollo who serves under Leona as the three sages of Papnika kingdom.

=== Baduck ===
Voiced by: Aruno Tahara (1991), Yōhei Tadano (2020)

Baduck (バダック, Badakku) is an elderly swordsman from Papnica, he is the first person from the kingdom that Dai, Popp and Maam meet after entering its borders. He can endure a decent fight despite his old age and lack of magical abilities, and he also has a knack for crafting useful items and is surprisingly good at repairing magical weapons.

=== Merle ===
Voiced by: Chieko Nanba (1991), Konomi Kohara (2020)

Merle (メルル, Meruru) is a gifted clairvoyant who occasionally helps the party with her divination. She falls in love with Popp. Towards the end of the story, she protects Popp and is badly injured when she is attacked by Zaboera, and when she realizes her death, she confesses her feelings about her to Popp. Even if that sentiment is not reciprocated, she manages to save herself thanks to Popp's magic that saves her. After the final battle, she went on a journey with Popp and Maam.

=== Nabara ===
Voiced by: Hiroko Emori (1991), Toma Shiota (2020)

Nabara (ナバラ) is a Merle's grandmother, also a fortune teller.

=== Soala ===
Voiced by: Wakana Yamazaki (1991), Ai Kayano (2020)

Soala (ソアラ, Soara) is the princess of Alkeed's kingdom who is Baran's wife and Dai's mother. Thanks to her father's prejudice against Baran for being a Dragon Knight, she elopes with him and lives with him peacefully until they are found by Alkeed's forces. She is killed while protecting Baran from being executed after surrendering to protect his family, which brings her beloved to loathe humans, to the point of destroying the entire kingdom and joining forces with Hadlar and Vearn.

=== Lon Berk ===
Voiced by: Hiroki Tōchi

Lon Berk (ロン・ベルク, Ron Beruku) (or Lon Beruk in the 2020 version) is a demonic swordsman who produced several weapons for Vearn, including Hyunckel and Larhart's armor and a magical scepter used by Vearn himself. He appears in the middle of the manga and begins to help the heroes in the fight against Vearn. He lives in a forest near the village of Lankax. Disappointed by the incompetence of weapon users, he decided not to produce them anymore. However, surprised by Dai's power, he builds for him the most powerful sword in the world and later creates other weapons for his friends, so that they can assist him in battle, and joins the frontlines against Vearn's army.

=== Nova ===
Voiced by: Nobuhiko Okamoto

Nova (ノヴァ) is a human swordsman nicknamed "Warrior of the North", a native of the kingdom of Ringala and son of a general of the kingdom. He thinks he is a "real hero" and that Dai is an imposter. He quickly changes his mind and Dai and his friends are struck by his determination and willingness to sacrifice himself to save people from demons. He can make his Aura Sword extremely powerful at the cost of his own life. He will later become Lon Berk's apprentice.

=== Brokeena ===
Voiced by: Yū Mizushima

Brokeena (ブロキーナ, Burokina) is a retired martial arts master of the kingdom of Romos, he trained Chiu and Maam; in the past he was also Avan's companion in battle. His age doesn't allow him to fight for long, but he makes up for this lack with his experience.

=== Chiu ===
Voiced by: Shun Horie

Chiu (チウ) is a big anthropomorphic mouse, Brokeena's martial arts student along with Maam, with whom he is in love, which leads to a rivalry with Popp. With the help of the Beast King's Flute, the monsters that are summoned by him serve as his teammates after Chiu defeats them. The little rat makes his own squad of beasts called The Beast King Comandos.

=== Flora ===
Voiced by: Rie Takahashi

Flora (フローラ, Furora) is the queen of Carl's reign and Avan's secret girlfriend, one of the first people to notice his true talent and member of his original party. After the destruction of her kingdom, she has been waiting for an opportunity to fight back with a loyal group of soldiers. Flora knows how to use all kinds of weapons such as the sword or the whip.

== The Demon Lord's Army ==
The Dark Lord Hadlar's army was created by the Demon Lord Vearn to conquer the surface world of humans and is split into six different regiments to maintain control over their vast numbers. Every group is focused on conquest with the exception of the Sorcerer Regiment, which dedicates itself more with studies and experiments to help further the Dark Lord's plans:

- Hundred Beast Regiment: Composed of animal, plant, insect and other common monsters, led by Crocodine.
- The Undead Knights Regiment: Composed of skeletons, zombies, and other undead monsters, led by Hyunckel.
- Ice and Fire Demon Regiment: Composed of monsters with elemental properties, led by Flazzard.
- Sorcerer Regiment: Composed of monsters skilled with magic, led by Zaboera.
- Super Dragon Regiment: Composed of dragons and other giant monsters, it is considered the strongest of the six regiments, led by Baran.
- Shadow Regiment: Composed of shadow attackers who fight without revealing their form, animated by a soul they received from the demon lord, led by Mystvearn.

=== Hadlar ===
Voiced by: Takeshi Aono (1991), Tomokazu Seki (2020) (Japanese); Brian Drummond (2020) (English)

357-years old, the leader of the Great Demon King's Army. Hadlar (ハドラー, Hadorā) was the previous Dark Lord until he was defeated by Avan. Hadlar was resurrected by the Great Demon Lord Vearn, and thus turned to serving him. Two of Hadlar's strongest spells are Kaboom and Kasizzle, the highest level spell of the two respective types. After Hadlar was killed by Avan, Vearn resurrected him into a stronger body that could be revived countless times by Vearn's magic, with each revival increasing his power. This body proved to be too weak in the face of Dai and his companions, so Hadlar uses Zaboera to transform him into a hyper demon, which allows him to acquire a massive increase in power and gives him regenerative properties. When Hadlar uses this newfound power to defeat Dai, Vearn rewards him by giving him 5 Orhicalcum chess pieces, which Hadlar uses forbidden magic on to create his Orhicalcum Royal Guard warriors. Hadlar was killed when his body was too damaged to regenerate anymore after his final fight with Dai, and turned into dust.

=== The Dark King Vearn ===
Voiced by: Kenji Utsumi (1991), Takaya Hashi (2020), Takehito Koyasu (real form 2020) (Japanese); Paul Dobson (2020) (English)

The Dark King Vearn (大魔王バーン, Daimaō Bān) is the supreme leader of the Dark Army and the main antagonist of the series who calls himself the god of the Darklings. Vearn hates that the gods gave humans the surface world to live while the Darklings have to live without the sun. Thus his goal is to blast away the surface using a hexagonal Black Core explosion field to both rid the world of weak humans while also giving the sun to the Darklings. Near the end of the manga, it was revealed that in order to achieve immortality, Vearn separated his body into two parts. The body he directly controls retains the intelligence and magic power, while the body that was given to Myst retained his physical strength. The second body became Mystvearn. Vearn used his great magic power to use the spell of Frozen Time on Mystvearn. As Myst is a unique case of being able to manipulate a body that is affected by that spell, Mystvearn's body effectively acquired immortality, while Vearn's body, while growing in intelligence and magic power, kept aging. After being defeated by Dai, Vearn decided to restore his original body and became more powerful than ever. He was defeated again with great difficulty by Dai and turned into stone. Vearn has the ability to cast almost every type of magic available, including one of his strongest types: Frizz-type magic (his Frizz is stronger than Popp's Kafrizzle). Because Vearn can also cast healing spells, he is considered a Sage class, one of the highest class of magicians. Vearn also had a staff given to him by Lon Berk, which can turn magic power into physical attack power, though it eats power at an immense rate. Vearn's most powerful attacks are a phoenix-shaped Kafrizzle, Kaiser Phoenix, a palm heel strike with touki that can repel or reflect attacks and spells called Phoenix Wing, a touki hand chop that is as sharp and deadly as Dai's sword, called Calamity End, Calamity Wall, a wall of rushing energy created by either his legendary staff or his barehand, and finally, the Tenchi-Madou, an ultimate counter move that unleashes Kaiser Phoenix, Phoenix Wing, and Calamity End simultaneously. As his final trump card, by ripping out his third eye the Kigan, Vearn transforms into a giant monster called the Kiganou, allowing his power to rival Dai's Ryumajin form, but as the Kigan is the source of his magic, Vearn loses the ability to cast spells as well as being unable to return to his normal self.

=== Flazzard ===
Voiced by: Ken Yamaguchi (1991), Tōru Nara (2020) (Japanese); Brian Drummond (2020) (English)

Flazzard (フレイザード, Fureizādo) was created by Hadlar using forbidden magic. His body is a combination of fire and ice and he can uses both elements to attack. Flazzard cares only for glory and winning, doing whatever to achieve it and taking no interest in fair fights. Because he was created and not born like other beings he takes to living in the moment since he feels a long life without glory is meaningless. He was killed by Mystvearn after failing to defeat Dai.

=== Zaboera ===
Voiced by: Naoki Tatsuta (1991), Mitsuo Iwata (2020) (Japanese); Lee Tockar (2020) (English)

About 800 years old, Zaboera (ザボエラ) is small and highly intelligent, relying on trickery to get what he wants. He does not care for anybody and regards everyone as his tools, including his son Zamza, who he used to acquire essential information on the development of hyper demons. He has his troops fight for him since he does not like to get his hands dirty. He hides in the shadows and will claim anyone's accomplishments as his own if it helps further his plans. He can cast Thwack, which can cause instant death to a group of opponents, and Morph, which can assume the form of anyone. He also has poison related arsenals. He was killed by Crocodine in one of the last battles in the series.

=== Zamza ===
Voiced by: Akio Suyama (Japanese); Ian Hanlin (English)

Zamza (ザムザ, Zamuza) is a Zaboera's son and member of the Yomashidan. He shares many traits with his father, as he is arrogant and likes to manipulate others. However, Zaboera has openly admitted that he considers him only a tool, and Zamza deeply desires to be praised by his father. At one point, he was sent to the kingdom of Romos and manipulated the king to hold the martial arts tournament so that he could fight the participants in his hyperdemon form to collect battle data. After the end of the tournament, Zaboera imprisoned the gladiators in his living prison. He then transformed into a monstrous hyper-demon and fights Dai, devouring him after defeating him. But Maam manages to break through the prison and injure Zamza by over-healing him by making him throw up Dai. Seeing this, Dai uses his sword to mortally wound Zamza. After transmitting the battle data to Zaboera, Zamza disintegrates as he tells the heroes that one day they would be defeated by a perfected hyperdemon.

=== Mystvearn ===
Voiced by: Keiichi Nanba (1991), Takehito Koyasu (2020), Toshio Forukawa (real form 2020) (Japanese); Alex Zahara (2020) (English)

One of the Commanders of the Great Demon King Vearn's army, Mystvearn (ミストバーン, Misutobān) was Hyunckel's evil teacher. In one of the twists near the end of the manga it is revealed that Mystvearn is really a ghost-like being inhabiting one half of Vearn's body while at the same time protecting it. While he has no physical fighting ability of any kind in his true form, he has the ability to possess anyone and turn them into his puppet (Shadow Puppet Grab). He is possibly one of the oldest creatures to exist. Was killed in Hyunckel's body during an attempt to possess him.

=== Killvearn ===
Voiced by: Hideyuki Tanaka (1991), Hiroyuki Yoshino (2020) (Japanese); Ian Hanlin (2020 (English)

Called the shinigami, Killvearn (キルバーン, Kirubān) is an assassin whose task is to dispose of members of the Great Demon King's Army that have betrayed Vearn. He is accompanied by his small helper Piroro. In the end it is revealed that Killvearn was actually working for Vearn's rival, Velther. His job was to kill Vearn once he had a chance. It is also found out that Killvearn is just Piroro's mechanical puppet, and that behind Killvearn's mask is a Black Core. Piroro was killed by Maam while the Killvearn puppet was destroyed in the Black Core explosion triggered by Piroro.

==== Piroro ====
Voiced by: Hiroko Emori (1991), Hiroyuki Yoshino (2020) (Japanese); Ian Hanlin (2020) (English)

Piroro (ピロロ) is a small one-eyed being and Killvearn's companion. He appears to belong to the Rogue species, monsters that debuted in Dragon Quest IV. At the end of the manga he completes his true identity.

=== Maximum ===
Voiced by: Tesshō Genda (Japanese); Michael Dobson (English)

Like Hadlar's Royal Guard, Maximum (マキシマム, Makishimamu) was created from a king chess piece made of orihalcon, and commands the other pieces, who serve as guards of Vearn's palace, being the only among them who was given a conscience. Arrogant and boastful; Maximum relies solely on his powers to gauge the opponent's strength. He is defeated by Hyunckel and eliminated by Larhart.

=== Goroa ===
Voiced by: Yasuhiro Takato (Japanese); Brian Dobson (English)

Goroa (ゴロア) is a crimson-skinned monster tasked with being the guardian of the dark power reactor, the machine that draws power from Vearn to emanate it throughout his palace. Its big and round belly is a drum that if hit creates gravitational waves, designed to calm the reactor and increase the weight acting on its victims.

=== The Dragon Masters ===
Baran's loyal subordinates. They are extremely loyal to their commander and share his hatred of humanity. They are said to be as strong as the six generals of the Demon Army. In the first Italian edition of the manga they are called Dragon Warriors.

==== Larhalt ====
Voiced by: Akira Ishida (Japanese); Scott Roberts (English)

Larhalt (ラーハルト, Rafaruto) is a son of a demon and a human and leader of the terrestrial division of Baran's troops. He fights using a spear-shaped Amudo, of the same properties as Hyunckel's. He is defeated by Hyunckel and gives him the Spear in Armor before dying; He is later resurrected by Baran's blood and joins the humans in order to protect Dai and respect Baran's last wishes.

==== Galdandy ====
Voiced by: Subaru Kimura (Japanese); Lee Tockar (English)

Galdandy (ガルダンディー, Garudandi) is a birdman and head of the Baran Air Force Division, he is killed in battle by Popp. His special technique is to throw his feathers like knives at opponents, thus depriving them of their magical power and physical strength.

==== Borahorn ====
Voiced by: Kenji Sugimura (Japanese); Steve Olson (English)

Borahorn (ボラホーン, Borahōn) is a walrus man and head of the marine division of Baran's troops, he is defeated by Hyunckel and eliminated by Larhalt, disgusted by his treachery. His technique is to crush his opponents by combining his monstrous strength with cold breath.

=== Hadlar's Royal Guard ===
The personal bodyguards of Hadlar Leader of the Demon Lords army. Hadlar created them from chess pieces made of orihalcon provided by Vearn to replace the defeated leaders of the six regiments. Since they were created like Flazzard their core must be destroyed in order to defeat them, which is located in the left chest just like a human's heart and can only be damaged by orihalcon weapons, or extremely powerful spells such as Frizz Cracker. As the Guardian Knights have a chess motif, each is themed after a different piece except for the king, Maximum, who remained in Vearn's possession.

==== Hym ====
Voiced by: Shin-ichiro Miki (Japanese); Griffin Cork (English)

Hym (ヒム) created from a pawn piece he understands perfectly well that there will always be someone better than him. He, like the rest of the knights, fight fairly and praises worthy fighters. He mostly seems to live by the concept of "an eye for an eye" since he said he would not be satisfied until he punched a hole in Hyunckel's forehead as Hyunckel had pierced a hole in his. He had his own arm cut off after it became limp since he believed it would become a distraction during a fight, and has shown that he is a bit of a hot head getting lost in the heat of battle and not wanting to stop even if it was not his prime objective. He is an expert in mera (fire) spells but only uses them to increase the power of his fists. In the final part of the story, Hym discovers he actually is the reincarnation of his master, acquiring Hadlar's silver hair and the ability to generate Touki as an organic being.

==== Sigma ====
Voiced by: Chikahiro Kobayashi (Japanese); Hiro Kanagawa (English)

Sigma (シグマ, Shiguma) is a horse warrior, has the Mirror of Shahal on his chest. This object can repel enemy spells and Sigma can also use as a shield. With his horse legs he has the highest speed and jumping ability of the group, which also allows him to perform a double jump in any eight directions. He attacks using a lance. He is also very perceptive to the point of pointing out the flaw in any action someone may take against Hadlar. Sigma was killed by Pop.

==== Fenbren ====
Voiced by: Koji Yusa (Japanese); Giles Panton (English)

Fenbren (フェンブレン, Fenburen) is a standard bearer warrior, he calls himself the perfect hunter because his body is made up of eight sharp sections. He has mastered all bagi (wind) type spells. He is unlike the rest of the knights since he himself stated that he is cruel in battle. He can use his sword arms as drills to tunnel underground to avoid attacks but he will not use it to attack from behind. He lost his eyes when Baran attacked him but afterwards he gained the ability to sense where his enemies and other objects of orihalcon are. He was cut in half by Dai while guarding the underwater door to the Demon Lord.

==== Block ====
Voiced by: Tokuyoshi Kawashima (Japanese); Paul Dobson (English)

Block (ブロック, Burokku) is a tower warrior, he is the physically strongest of the group, with strength exceeding that of Crocodine, he cannot speak fully so he relies on others to speak for him. To protect his fellow knights he threw himself over them to take a powerful magic attack. His one technique comes from the castling move in chess which causes him to split in two revealing a more human body underneath that can quickly switch places with the king (Hadlar). The one time he used this move was to save Hadlar from Vearn before transporting Hadlar and his fellow knights to safety but not before saying his first and last words "Everyone take care of Lord Hadlar".

==== Albinass ====
Voiced by: Yukari Tamura (Japanese); Jamie Konchak (English)

Created from a queen piece, Albinass (アルビナス, Arubinassu) is the one who coordinates the group's attacks, acting as the group's voice of reason and reminding them that they fight for Hadlar. While she is considered the only female of the group she has stated that the group members have no gender and that each is powerful in they own way. She treats every battle as a game of chess, going as far as calling those fighting "pieces". She attacks using needles (called Needle Thousand) which are hard to dodge since they cover a very large area; the only flaw is that Albinass cannot or does not move when using it, making her a sitting duck for anyone lucky enough to escape her attack. She normally keeps her arms and legs sealed under her metallic cloak but when she does use them her speed and strength increase dramatically. Additionally with her arms unsealed she uses her magic in a compressed ball (called Thousand Ball) for more precise attacks in place of her normally wide range needle attack. Her loyalty to Hadlar is second to none, even to the point of being mistaken for loving devotion. Albinass was killed by Maam.
