= Gmina Kąkolewnica =

Gmina Kąkolewnica Kąkolewnica Commune
- Gmina
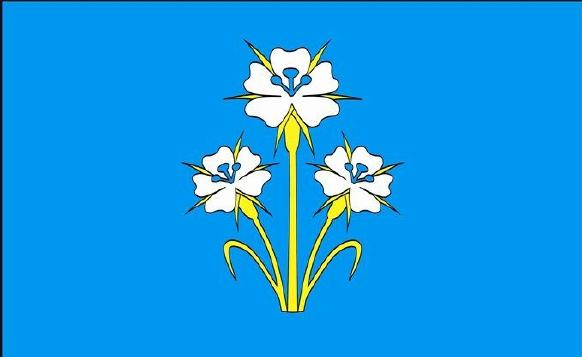
- Flag Coat of arms

- Location within Poland
- Coordinates (Kąkolewnica): 51°56′N 22°43′E
- Country: Poland
- Voivodeship: Lublin
- County: Radzyń
- Seat: Kąkolewnica

Area
  - Total: 147.71 km^{2} (57.03 sq mi)

Population (2006)
  - Total: 8,459
  - Density: 57.27/km^{2} (148.3/sq mi)
- Website: http://www.kakolewnica.lublin.pl/

Gmina Kąkolewnica is a rural gmina (administrative district) in Radzyń County, Lublin Voivodeship, in eastern Poland. Its seat is the village of Kąkolewnica, which lies approximately 18 kilometres (11 mi) north of Radzyń Podlaski and 77 km (48 mi) north of the regional capital Lublin.

The gmina covers an area of 147.71 square kilometres (57.0 sq mi), and as of 2006 its total population is 8,459. Up to 2010 it was called Gmina Kąkolewnica Wschodnia, and had its seat in the village of Kąkolewnica Wschodnia ("East Kąkolewnica"), which is now part of Kąkolewnica.

== Villages ==
Gmina Kąkolewnica contains the villages and settlements of Brzozowica Duża, Brzozowica Mała, Grabowiec, Jurki, Kąkolewnica, Lipniaki, Miłolas, Mościska, Olszewnica, Polskowola, Sokule, Turów, Wygnanka, Żakowola Poprzeczna, Żakowola Radzyńska, Żakowola Stara and Zosinowo.

== Neighbouring gminas ==
Gmina Kąkolewnica is bordered by the gminas of Drelów, Łuków, Międzyrzec Podlaski, Radzyń Podlaski, Trzebieszów and Ulan-Majorat.
