= Baran, Russia =

Baran (Russian: Баран) is the name of several rural localities in Russia.

== Modern localities ==
- Baran, Sudislavsky District, Kostroma Oblast, a selo in Sudislavskoye Settlement of Sudislavsky District in Kostroma Oblast; 57°54′N 41°44′E

== Abolished localities ==
- Baran, Mezhevskoy District, Kostroma Oblast, a settlement in Petushikhsky Selsoviet of Mezhevskoy District of Kostroma Oblast; abolished on October 6, 2004
