= John Hall Barron =

British philatelist

John Hall Barron (15 April 1873 – 5 January 1951) was a British philatelist and president of the Royal Philatelic Society London 1940–46. Barron was a specialist in the philately of Mexico.

== Selected publications in The London Philatelist ==
- "Mexico: Its Names and Numbers", Volume XXIX, p. 112.
- "The Counterfeits of the 1856 and 1861 Issues of Mexico", Volume XXXII, pp. 214, 239; Volume XXXIII, p. 41.
- "The 1868-72 Issues of Mexico, overprinted exceptionally, at Mexico City", Volume XLII, p. 280.
- "The Colombia Numeral Issues of 1904", Volume XXXIV, p. 211.
- "The Settings of the 1908 Issue of Colombia", Volume XXXVII, p. 34.
- "Colombia, Provisional Issues, 1920-23", Volume XLI, p. 85.
- "The First Official Issue of Paraguay, and its Counterfeit", Volume XXXIX, p. 34.
