= Pampushka =

Ukrainian sweet or pastry

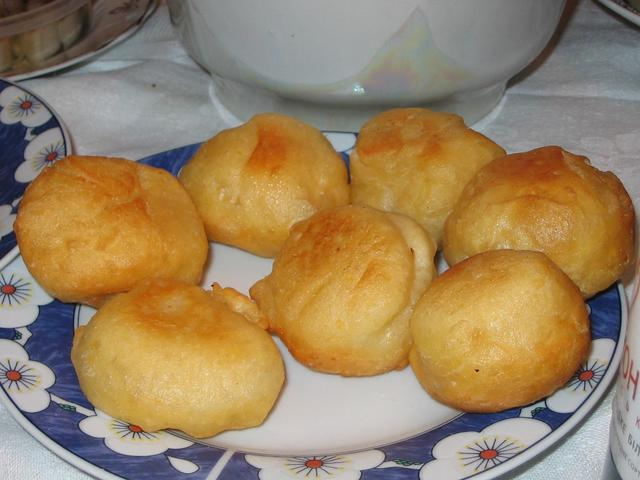
- Plain pampushky
- Place of origin: Ukraine

Pampushka (Ukrainian: пампушка [pɐmˈpuʃkɐ], pl. пампушки pampushky; diminutive of pampukh or pampukha) is a small savory or sweet yeast-raised bun or doughnut typical for Ukrainian cuisine.

== Etymology ==
The Ukrainian word pampukh comes via Polish pampuch (a kind of thick dumpling or steamed doughnut) from German Pfannkuchen ("pancake"). Similarly to English "pancake", the latter derives from Pfanne ("pan") and Kuchen ("cake"). The diminutive form pampushka is used more frequently than the basic form.

== Varieties ==
Pampushky are made of yeast dough from wheat, rye or buckwheat flour. Traditionally, they are baked, but may also be fried. Savoury pampushky have no filling. They are usually seasoned with garlic sauce and often served as a side dish with red borscht or yushka. Sweet pampushky may be filled with fruits, berries, varenye, povydlo, or poppy seeds, and topped with powdered sugar.

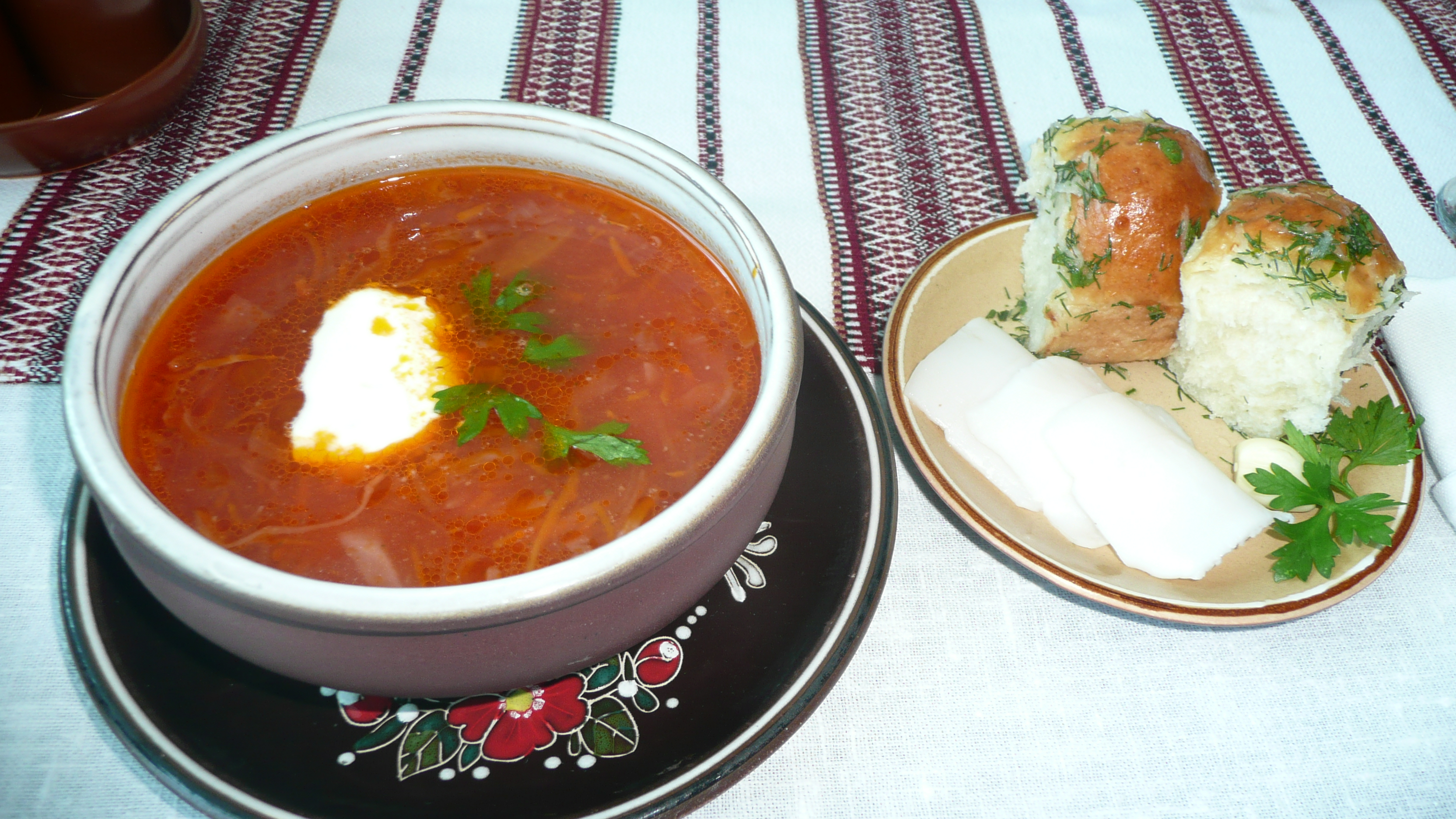
Ukrainian borscht served with garlic pampushky and three slices of salo

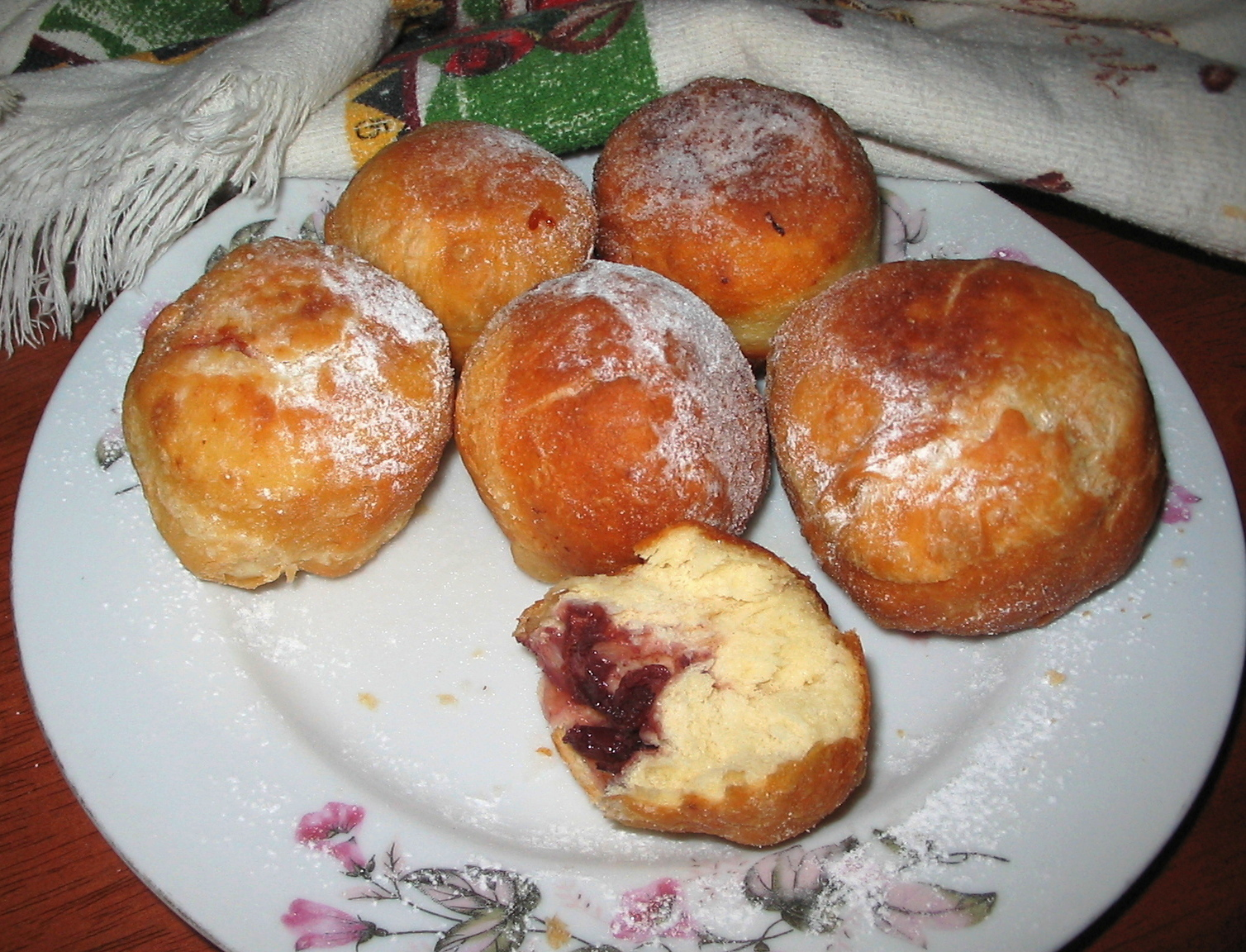
Pampushky with cherries and icing-sugar topping

== History ==
According to William Pokhlyobkin, the technology of making pampushky points to German cuisine, and these buns were possibly created by German colonists in Ukraine. They spread through the country in the second half of the 19th century and later reached the status of a Ukrainian traditional dish.

== In popular culture ==
Since 2008, yearly Pampukh Festivals have been organised around Orthodox Christmas time (in January) in Lviv. During the festival in 2012, a Guinness world record was set by building the world's largest mosaic made of doughnuts.

== See also ==
- List of doughnut varieties
- List of fried dough varieties
- List of buns
