= Uroczysko Baran killing fields =

Location for secret executions of Poles by communist forces

Coordinates: 51°54′7.3″N 22°39′18.83″E

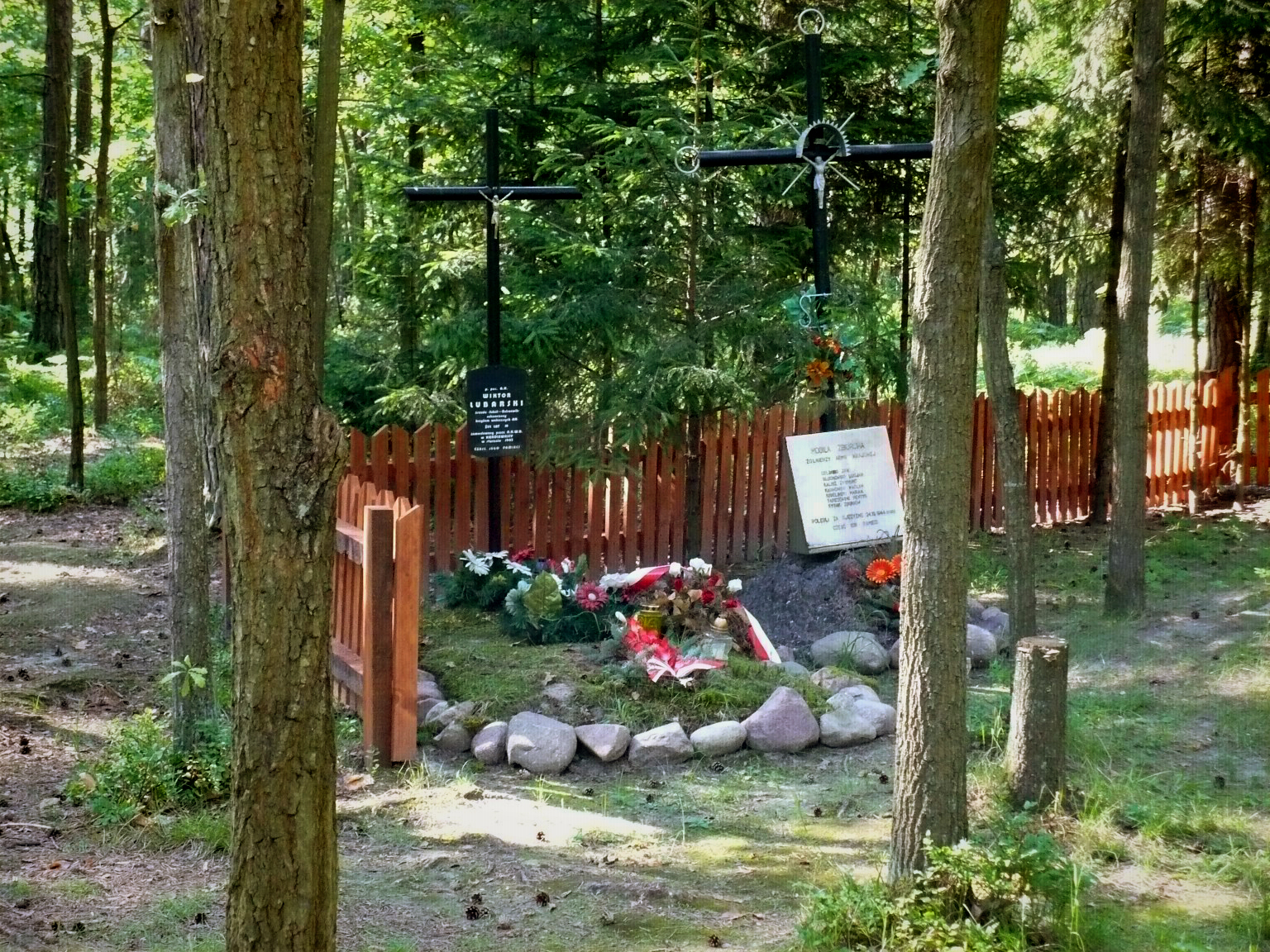
One of the mass graves of Uroczysko Baran

The Uroczysko Baran killing fields (Polish: miejsce zbrodni Uroczysko Baran, lit. 'Uroczysko Baran crime location'), often referred to in Poland as the "Little Katyn" or the "Second Katyn", was the location for secret executions of soldiers and officers of the Polish Underground State, Home Army, and Second Army of Ludowe Wojsko Polskie carried out by Communist forces on behalf of the NKVD, SMERSH, and PUBP in the later stages of World War II.

The killing fields at the Uroczysko Baran, (Note: "Uroczysko" is the Polish term for a geographical location of arbitrary type, typically within a forest, somehow identified among its surroundings. Baran means "ram" in Polish) also known as the Baran Forest, are located on the outskirts of Kąkolewnica village in eastern Poland, near Radzyń Podlaski. It is estimated that up to 1,200 or 1,800 wartime members of the Home Army (AK), Freedom and Independence (WiN), the Peasant Battalions (BCh), as well as Polish defectors drafted to the Communist armies, and alleged enemies of the people, were murdered there, with hands tied behind their backs, over execution pits, from late autumn 1944 until February 1945, . The forensic examination of twelve exhumed bodies revealed multiple bone fractures: broken hands, limbs, hips, and cracked skulls indicating extreme beatings in detention, before execution.

== History ==
The killing fields were known to the local people in Kąkolewnica from the beginning. In July 1944, the Soviet 1st Belorussian Front under Marshal Konstantin Rokossovsky was stationed in Kąkolewnica, removing cattle and plundering food supplies, throwing people out of their homes to make way for military lodgings, and setting up SMERSH and NKVD interrogation dungeons in the basements. Soon, General Świerczewski with his LWP soldiers joined the fray. The Polish partisans from AK, WiN and BCh, captured in the vicinity – but also transported there from afar – like the soldiers of the 27th Home Army Infantry Division, were executed across the vast area of the forest spanning well over a dozen hectares. Mass graves were planted over with small pine trees by the killers. A symbolic cross was erected on site by some people in the summer of 1945. Removed by the Communist officials, it was often replaced by the locals under the cover of night.

The number of people murdered at Uroczysko Baran is unknown. Even the number of mass graves has not been established to this day. After fifty years of Communist rule in Poland, the closely guarded site is now overgrown with mature trees. Partial documents found in the archives of the Polish Army prove only 43 official executions and 144 military court convictions, but the Soviet archives are either inaccessible or no longer exist. Soon after the end of totalitarianism in Poland, the Institute of National Remembrance interviewed 110 witnesses. There was only one forensic exhumation conducted at Uroczysko Baran. The human remains were reburied at a local cemetery in Kąkolewnica in 1990. The IPN branch in Lublin states that some 2,000 anti-communist resistance fighters were detained in local prisons by the Stalinist security forces between 1944 and 1956, including 450 of the most prominent so-called "cursed soldiers".

Józef Franczak witnessed some of the killings. After Soviet troops entered the area, he was conscripted into the Polish Communist 2nd Army stationed in Kąkolewnica, where the military court was located. Franczak deserted in January 1945 and became a cursed soldier. He was shot dead in 1963. At Kąkolewnica, and at the Uroczysko Baran, hundreds of detainees died without a trial. According to witnesses, military trucks covered with tarpaulin travelled back and forth between the two locations until November 1945, day in and day out.

== Commemoration ==
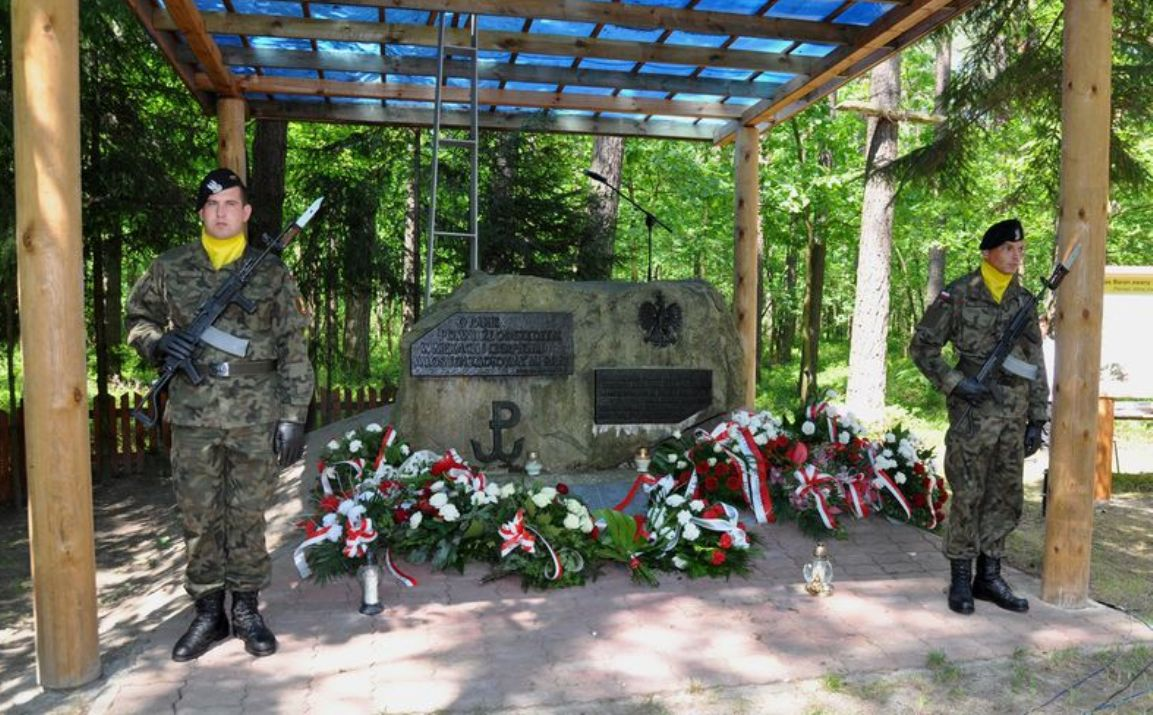
Honor guard at the Uroczysko Baran monument to murdered soldiers of AK and Second Army (Note: The left tablet on the stone says "O Panie, pomnij, że odszedłem w mękach i cierpieniu, a ten los zgotował mi brat" (O Lord, remember that I went away in torment and suffering, and my brother prepared me this fate). The second tablet says "Żołnierzom Armii Krajowej i Drugiej Armii Wojska Polskiego zamordowanym przez NKWD w latach 1944-1945. Współtowarzysze walki, rodziny, spolezcenstwo." The tablet on the ground lists the names of the 42 identified victims.)

The killings are the subject of a monograph by Jan Kołkowicz published in 2007.

In 1980 a symbolic grave was created at the uroczysko. In May 1993 it was replaced with a monument consisting of a cast iron cross and a huge stone with tablets. The monument was an initiative of Tadeusz Dzięga, the Kąkolewnica parish parson, and a resident of the village of Jurki, Zbigniew Puck.

President of Poland Bronisław Komorowski came to Uroczysko Baran on June 20, 2013, for a solemn ceremony of laying flowers and wreaths at the monument.
