= Petra Barran =

British street food entrepreneur

- Education: University of Manchester; University College London
- Employers: KERB; Eat Street; Choc Star
- Website: KERB

Petra Barran is a British entrepreneur and the founder of the London street food collective KERB. In 2005, Barran began her street food career selling chocolate out of an old ice cream van. As of 2019, KERB has five sites across London, which serve more than 10,000 dishes a week.

== Early life ==
Barran grew up in Suffolk, where her father was a fishmonger and schoolteacher who also grew and sold herbs, her mother was a teacher of dyslexic children. They lived in converted stables at a large house owned by her grandparents and ate roadkill.

She became interested in food during her childhood and was first introduced to street food at the age of ten in Mexico.

Her first job was in a local tearoom. She studied American Studies at the University of Manchester and earned a bachelor's degree in 1999.

== Early career ==
After graduating, Barran became interested in chocolate, and trained alongside the chocolatier Pierre Marcolini. From 2005 Barran sold chocolates out of an old ice cream van (named Jimmy) that she used to take to markets and events around the United Kingdom. She toured the United Kingdom, exchanging chocolate pudding for a bed for the night. Choc Star became an "acclaimed mobile chocolatier", selling hot chocolate, brownie fudge sundaes and Rocky Road. At a small festival that Choc Star was due to appear at, despite Barran having pitched and paid the fees, the festival folded days before it opened. When Barran learned that she could not be reimbursed, she became determined to not let this happen to anyone else, and came up with the idea of building a street food collective.

Barran had a recipe book from Sainsbury's, from which she cooked every item.

In 2005 Barran joined up with two other street food companies and formed Eat Street in 2009, which became a collective of 32 traders that opened in locations around London. In 2010, whilst on holiday in New York City, Barran decided to study for a master's degree in Urban Studies. She wanted to make cities more interesting through food. She retired her van Jimmy in 2011. That year Barran was selected as one of The Independent Ten People Who Changed The World. She completed her master's degree at University College London in 2013. She was part of the University College London Urban Laboratory, which is part of The Bartlett and the Department of Geography.

She has also lived in Africa and Italy.

== KERB ==
Barran launched KERB in 2012. She was determined to make the street food movement accessible for everyone. KERB is a community of street food providers whose customers include permanent London markets and corporate event organisers. She provides professional and logistical support for the vendors, as well as encouraging informal mentoring between them. She set up an incubator scheme inKERBator, which discovers and supports new street food providers. The incubator is a three-month programme, and KERB takes on around 5% of the intakes. Barran even created a magazine, the KERB manual, which provides information on the organisational structure and branding, as well as providing advice to people interested in starting a food truck. She has hosted theme festivals including events dedicated to fried chicken, vegan food and nostalgia. Several popular KERB businesses have gone on to become restaurants, including Pizza Pilgrims, Bleecker Burger and Bao. As of July 2019, KERB street food markets sell over 10,000 dishes a week at 5 markets across London.

Barran called for Boris Johnson (then Mayor of London) to help people sell street food around London. Barran delivered a TEDxLondon talk where she discussed how street food benefited society. KERB has several partnerships, including Street Child, supporting mothers in West Africa to set up their own businesses to fund school uniforms and supplies. In 2019 KERB opened a permanent resident at Seven Dials market in London. The site will host 25 vendors and features a cheese conveyor belt.

=== Awards and honours ===
Her awards and honours include;

- 2011 The Independent Ten People Who Changed The World
- 2012 Evening Standard Most Influential People
- 2015 Evening Standard Most Influential People
