= Wygnanka, Radzyń County =

Wygnanka
- Village
- Location within Poland
- Coordinates: 51°55′40″N 22°45′01″E
- Country: Poland
- Voivodeship: Lublin
- County: Radzyń
- Gmina: Kąkolewnica Wschodnia

Wygnanka [vɨɡˈnaŋka] is a village in the administrative district of Gmina Kąkolewnica Wschodnia, within Radzyń County, Lublin Voivodeship, in eastern Poland.
