= Baran, Pakistan =

Village in Sindh, Pakistan

Baran is a village situated on the edge of Baran Nai, a hill torrent that ranges from the Sindh to Balochistan provinces of Pakistan, at the foot of the Kirthar Mountains range.

The population is approximated to be less than ten thousand with the 95% population being the Gabol Baloch tribe with Sardar Nabil Ahmed Khan Gabol as the tribal head. Baran receives most of its precipitation from monsoon rains, and gives a very green looks as the rain water helps grow savannah. The region is rich in wildlife including the Sindh Ibex, deer, partridge, fox, hare and many species of small birds. The area is believed to be rich in fossil fuels as the China National Petroleum Company has set up a permanent base there, claiming to have already found natural gas.
