= Jurki, Lublin Voivodeship =

Jurki
- Village
- Location within Poland
- Coordinates: 51°53′N 22°40′E
- Country: Poland
- Voivodeship: Lublin
- County: Radzyń
- Gmina: Kąkolewnica Wschodnia

Jurki [ˈjurki] is a village in the administrative district of Gmina Kąkolewnica Wschodnia, within Radzyń County, Lublin Voivodeship, in eastern Poland.
