= John Barran =

John Barran may refer to:

- Sir John Barran, 1st Baronet (1821–1905)
- Sir John Barran, 2nd Baronet (1872–1952)
- Sir John Leighton Barran, 3rd Baronet (1904–1974) of the Barran baronets
- Sir John Napoleon Ruthven Barran, 4th Baronet (1934–2010) of the Barran baronets
- Sir John Ruthven Barran, 5th Baronet (born 1971) of the Barran baronets
- John Robert Nicholson Barran (born 2008), heir of the Barran baronets

== See also ==
- Barran (surname)
