= Dragon Quest: The Adventure of Dai (2020 TV series) =

The cover of the first Blu-ray volume released by Avex Pictures

The 2020 Dragon Quest: The Adventure of Dai anime is based on the manga series of the same name written by Riku Sanjo and illustrated by Koji Inada, based on the popular video game franchise Dragon Quest. It tells the story of a young hero called Dai who, along his companions, fights to protect the world from an army of monsters led by the Dark Lord Hadlar and his master, the Dark King Vearn. It was announced during Jump Festa 2020 that there would be a new anime adaptation that would premiere in 2020. The anime was produced by Toei Animation and is a hybrid of 2D and CG animation. Unlike the original 1991 series, it adapted the entire plot of the manga series in 100 episodes. The series aired on TV Tokyo and other affiliates from October 3, 2020, to October 22, 2022.

The opening themes for the series are "Ikiru o Suru" by Macaroni Enpitsu from episodes 1–50 and "Bravest" by Taichi Mukai from episode 51 until its finale. The ending themes are "mother" by Macaroni Enpitsu from episodes 1–25, "Akashi" by XIIX from episodes 26–50, "Namae" by Humbreaders from episode 51–74, and "Tobutori wa" by Mitei no Hanashi from episode 75 until its finale.

Toei simulcast the series with English subtitles in North America, New Zealand, Africa, the Middle East and Europe via Crunchyroll, as well as Hulu in the United States. An English dub was produced by Toei and Ocean Media. It was initially the subject of a do-not-work notice issued by the American actor's union SAG-AFTRA. Muse Communication licensed the second series in Southeast Asia. The first 25 episodes began streaming in the United Kingdom on BBC's iPlayer on September 26, 2022. In North America, the first 50 dubbed episodes were made available on a variety of download to own platforms beginning November 8, 2022. The entire series began streaming in the United States on Hulu on July 1, 2023.

== Episodes ==
No.	Title	Directed by	Written by	Original release date
1	"Dai, the Tiny Hero"; Transliteration: "Chiisana Yūsha, Dai" (Japanese: 小さな勇者、ダイ)	Kazuya Karasawa	Katsuhiko Chiba	October 3, 2020
Dai, a young orphan, lives with a group of monsters who raised him on Dermine island and always dreamed of becoming a hero, but when a group of bandits appear to kidnap his friend Gome, Dai and his friends must fight to rescue him.
2	"Dai and Princess Leona"; Transliteration: "Dai to Reona Hime" (Japanese: ダイとレオナ姫)	Yoshihiro Ueda	Katsuhiko Chiba	October 10, 2020
A few weeks later, Dai is visited by Princess Leona from the Kingdom of Papnica, who enlists his help to protect her during an important ritual, which becomes quite the ordeal when he learns of a conspiracy to kill the princess and makes a stand to protect her.
3	"The Hero's Tutor"; Transliteration: "Yūsha no Kateikyōshi" (Japanese: 勇者の家庭教師)	Tsunekichi Ōmori; Kazuya Karasawa	Katsuhiko Chiba	October 17, 2020
Having learned of Dai's feats, Avan, a trainer of heroes, arrives at the island with his disciple, the magician Popp to become Dai's teacher, in preparation for the inevitable confrontation with the Dark Lord Hadlar, who rises once again with the intention to take over the world.
4	"The Dark Lord Hadlar's Return"; Transliteration: "Maō Hadorā no Fukkatsu" (Japanese: 魔王ハドラーの復活)	Tetsuya Wakano	Katsuhiko Chiba	October 24, 2020
Dai's training is interrupted with the arrival of Hadlar, who was resurrected by his new master, the Dark King Vearn, willing to enact his vengeance on Avan, who was the legendary hero who killed him 15 years ago.
5	"The Insignia of Avan"; Transliteration: "Aban no Shirushi" (Japanese: アバンのしるし)	Kazuya Karasawa	Katsuhiko Chiba	October 31, 2020
Avan sacrifices himself in a desperate attempt to kill Hadlar, but the Dark Lord survives. Hadlar prepares to kill Dai and his friends when the dragon sigil on Dai's head glows again, giving him the power to drive back the enemy.
6	"Crocodine, the Beast King"; Transliteration: "Jūō Kurokodain" (Japanese: 獣王クロコダイン)	Yoshihiro Ueda	Katsuhiko Chiba	November 7, 2020
Dai and Popp leave the island to begin their journey to defeat Vearn and his army. While losing themselves in a forest, they meet Maam, another of Avan's disciples and are attacked by Crocodine, one of Hadlar's generals.
7	"Maam's Turmoil"; Transliteration: "Maamu no Omoi" (Japanese: マァムの想い)	Hiroyuki Kakudō	Katsuhiko Chiba	November 14, 2020
After their fight with Crocodine, Dai and Popp prepare to continue their journey and Maam must choose between joining them or not.
8	"Furfang Full Assault"; Transliteration: "Hyakujū Sō-shingeki" (Japanese: 百獣総進撃)	Hideaki Ōba	Katsuhiko Chiba	November 21, 2020
Dai, Popp and Maam arrive at the Kingdom of Romos who is overrun by the Demon Army's invasion. In the occasion, Crocodine challenges Dai for a rematch.
9	"A Single Shard of Courage"; Transliteration: "Hito Kakera no Yūki" (Japanese: ひとかけらの勇気)	Masatoshi Chioka	Katsuhiko Chiba	November 28, 2020
Crocodine defeats Dai and Maam after using Dai's adoptive grandfather as a leverage against them. Popp, who was too afraid to fight at first, faces Crocodine alone to protect his friends.
10	"Onto Papnica Kingdom"; Transliteration: "Iza Papunika Ōkoku e" (Japanese: いざパプニカ王国へ)	Miki Komuro	Katsuyuki Sumisawa	December 5, 2020
After Crocodine's defeat, Hadlar assembles the remaining commanders at his fortress. Meanwhile, Dai and his companions' arrive at Papnica Kingdom, hoping to reunite with Princess Leona, just to find the entire country in ruins.
11	"Hyunckel, the Dark Swordsman"; Transliteration: "Maken Senshi Hyunkeru" (Japanese: 魔剣戦士ヒュンケル)	Masaki Watanabe	Katsuyuki Sumisawa	December 12, 2020
Dai and his party are attacked by Hyunckel, a former disciple of Avan who became one of Hadlar's commanders. In the occasion, Hyunckel's origins and the reason why he joined the Dark Lord's army are revealed.
12	"The Collaborative Zapple"; Transliteration: "Futari no Raidein" (Japanese: ふたりのライデイン)	Yoshihiro Ueda	Katsuyuki Sumisawa	December 19, 2020
Thanks to Crocodine's help, Dai and Popp escape with their lives. But Hyunckel is keeping Maam as a hostage and they fight him again to rescue her.
13	"The Deciding Moment"; Transliteration: "Ketchaku no Toki" (Japanese: 決着の瞬間)	Yūta Tanaka	Katsuyuki Sumisawa	December 26, 2020
Despite their combined attack working, Dai and Popp are still at a disadvantage against Hyunckel, until Maam reunites with her friends and reveals the truth about the death of Hyunckel's adoptive father.
14	"Blizzblaze General Flazzard"; Transliteration: "Hyōen Shōgun Fureizādo" (Japanese: 氷炎将軍フレイザード)	Hiroyuki Kakudō	Katsuhiko Chiba	January 9, 2021
Dai's party learn the location where Princess Leona took refuge, which is under attack by Flazzard, the third of Hadlar's generals.
15	"The Terrifying Curse Field"; Transliteration: "Kyōfu no Kekkai Juhō" (Japanese: 恐怖の結界呪法)	Yoshihiro Ueda	Katsuhiko Chiba	January 16, 2021
Dai and his friends arrive in time to confront Flazzard, but the enemy general uses his trump card to weaken his enemies and drive them into a corner.
16	"The Grand Sorcerer Matoriv"; Transliteration: "Dai Madōshi Matorifu" (Japanese: 大魔道士マトリフ)	Hideaki Ōba	Katsuyuki Sumisawa	January 23, 2021
After barely escaping with their lives, Dai and co. train with the magician Matoriv, one of Avan's companions, while making a plan to rescue Leona from Flazzard's grasp.
17	"The Death-Defying Savior"; Transliteration: "Fujimi no Kyūseishu" (Japanese: 不死身の救世主)	Hiroaki Miyamoto	Katsuhiko Chiba	January 30, 2021
Dai and his friends begin their plan to rescue Leona, but Hadlar appears and holds a joint assault along with two other generals, Mystvearn and Zaboera. When all seems lost, Crocodine and Hyunckel arrive to assist them.
18	"Hyunckel Versus Hadlar"; Transliteration: "Hyunkeru Tai Hadorā" (Japanese: ヒュンケル対ハドラー)	Masaki Watanabe	Katsuyuki Sumisawa	February 6, 2021
With help from Crocodine and Hyunckel, Dai holds the front against Hadlar and his army. To avenge his foster father, Hyunckel challenges Hadlar to a duel.
19	"The Final Avan Style Technique"; Transliteration: "Aban Ryū Saigo no Ōgi" (Japanese: アバン流最後の奥義)	Yūta Tanaka	Katsuhiko Chiba	February 13, 2021
Dai and his companions come face to face with Flazzard. In the occasion, Dai finally masters Avan's ultimate technique and fights the enemy with all his might.
20	"Now I Slice Everything"; Transliteration: "Ima Subete o Kiru" (Japanese: 今すべてを斬る)	Hiroyuki Kakudō	Katsuhiko Chiba	February 20, 2021
Flazzard has been destroyed, but Leona is still under his freezing spell and her life is in danger. To save Leona, Maam comes with an idea, but is forced to sacrifice her magic gun to make it work.
21	"Maam's Decision"; Transliteration: "Maamu no Ketsui" (Japanese: マァムの決意)	Masaki Utsunomiya	Katsuyuki Sumisawa	February 27, 2021
Having lost her main weapon, Maam decides that she must look for another way to be useful to the party. Meanwhile, after their defeat against Dai and the others, the Dark Lord Hadlar and his forces begin their preparations for a counterattack.
22	"Off to The Department Store"; Transliteration: "Depāto e Ikō" (Japanese: デパートへ行こう)	Yoshihiro Ueda	Katsuyuki Sumisawa	March 6, 2021
With Maam away for training, Leona takes Dai and Popp to the town of Bengarna to update their equipment, when a pack of dragons attack the city.
23	"The Dragon Knight"; Transliteration: "Doragon no Kishi" (Japanese: 竜の騎士)	Hiroaki Miyamoto	Katsuhiko Chiba	March 13, 2021
Dai, Popp and Leona protect the city from the dragons, but after the battle, a soothsayer approaches the party and reveals what she knows about Dai's origins.
24	"Dragon Master General Baran"; Transliteration: "Ryūkishō Baran" (Japanese: 竜騎将バラン)	Hideaki Ōba	Katsuhiko Chiba	March 20, 2021
Dai is approached by Baran, the last of Hadlar's generals who asks for him to become his subordinate. When Dai refuses, Baran attacks him, revealing the connection between them.
25	"The Terrifying Draconic Aura"; Transliteration: "Senritsu no Doragonikku Ōra" (Japanese: 戦慄の竜闘気)	Yūta Tanaka	Katsuhiko Chiba	March 27, 2021
Despite learning that Dai is Baran's son, his friends refuse to let him take Dai away and fight the enemy with all their might, until Baran uses his power to wipe out Dai's memories and flees.
26	"The Dragon Masters Approach"; Transliteration: "Ryūkishū Dai Sekkin" (Japanese: 竜騎衆大接近)	Fumihiko Suganuma	Katsuhiko Chiba	April 3, 2021
Certain that Baran will return to pick up Dai, Leona and the others look for a way to hide him. To protect his friends, Popp pretends to desert the party but faces Baran and his three Dragon Riders alone instead, despite knowing that there is no chance of survival.
27	"Land Rider Larhart"; Transliteration: "Rikusen-ki Rāharuto" (Japanese: 陸戦騎ラーハルト)	Hiroyuki Kakudō	Katsuyuki Sumisawa	April 10, 2021
Popp is rescued by Hyunckel and they confront the Dragon Riders together, while Baran proceeds alone to reclaim his son.
28	"Dai's Secret"; Transliteration: "Dai no Himitsu" (Japanese: ダイの秘密)	Yoshihiro Ueda	Katsuyuki Sumisawa	April 17, 2021
Hyunckel is overpowered by Larhart, the last of the Dragon Riders. As he looks for a way to make a comeback, he learns from the enemy about Baran's past and the tragic fate of Dai's mother.
29	"Baran's Rage"; Transliteration: "Baran no Ikari" (Japanese: バランの怒り)	Takao Kiriyama	Katsuyuki Sumisawa	April 24, 2021
Baran arrives at the castle where Dai is being held to reclaim his son. Dai's companions confront Baran to protect their friend, but little they can do before his overwhelming power.
30	"Popp's Resolve"; Transliteration: "Poppu no Kakugo" (Japanese: ポップの覚悟)	Kazuya Karasawa	Katsuhiko Chiba	May 1, 2021
Baran unlocks his true power as a Dragon Knight and attacks the party. Hearing his father's call, Dai appears before Baran and Popp puts himself in harm's way to protect his friend.
31	"A Father and Son Clash"; Transliteration: "Chichi to Ko no Tatakai" (Japanese: 父と子の戦い)	Hiroaki Miyamoto	Katsuhiko Chiba	May 8, 2021
Thanks to Popp's sacrifice, Dai recovers his lost memories and fights Baran to defend his friends while Leona uses a spell she never tried before to revive their fallen comrade.
32	"Farewell to the Father"; Transliteration: "Chichi to no Ketsubetsu" (Japanese: 父との決別)	Yūta Tanaka	Katsuhiko Chiba	May 15, 2021
Dai is about to be killed by Baran when Hyunckel and Crocodine come up with one last effort to help him. On his way to the afterlife, Popp learns that Dai is still in danger and comes back with a miracle.
33	"Zaboera's Scheme"; Transliteration: "Zaboera no Kisaku" (Japanese: ザボエラの奇策)	Kayona Yamada	Katsuyuki Sumisawa	May 22, 2021
After Hadlar's successive failures, the Dark King Vearn gives him one last chance to redeem himself, and with Zaboera's help, the Dark Lord attacks Dai and his friends while they are still recovering from their fight with Baran.
34	"The Romos Martial Arts Tournament"; Transliteration: "Romosu Bujutsu Taikai" (Japanese: ロモス武術大会)	Akifumi Zako	Katsuhiko Chiba	May 29, 2021
While Leona travels the world to make preparations for the imminent war against the Dark Lord's army, Dai and Popp return to Romos to attend the local martial arts tournament. In the occasion, they reunite with Maam, who finished her training and is also participating in the competition.
35	"The Incident at the Finals"; Transliteration: "Kesshōsen no Ihen" (Japanese: 決勝戦の異変)	Fumihiko Suganuma	Katsuhiko Chiba	June 5, 2021
Maam qualifies for the final stage of the tournament when Zamza, the son of Zaboera reveals himself as the one who orchestrated the entire event as part of his plan to gather strong subjects for his father's experiments. To save Maam and the others, Dai confronts the enemy until he shows his true powers.
36	"The Superior Being Versus Chiu"; Transliteration: "Chō Ma Seibutsu Tai Chiu" (Japanese: 超魔生物対チウ)	Hiroyuki Kakudō	Katsuyuki Sumisawa	June 12, 2021
Dai collapses from exhaustion and is swallowed whole by Zamza. With help from Maam's comrade, the rat martial artist Chiu, Popp comes up with a plan to rescue Dai, while Maam herself fights to escape capture and assist her friends.
37	"All in an Instant"; Transliteration: "Isshun ni Subete o" (Japanese: 一瞬にすべてを)	Yoshihiro Ueda	Katsuyuki Sumisawa	June 19, 2021
Maam escapes the trap and fights Zamza alone. When the enemy corners her, Dai decides to muster all his remaining power in one last attack to defeat him.
SP	"The Trail of Adventure, the Path Forward"; Transliteration: "Bōken no Kiseki, Kore Kara no Tabiji" (Japanese: 冒険の軌跡、これからの旅路)	N/A	N/A	June 26, 2021
A recap of the first 37 episodes.
38	"The World Summit"; Transliteration: "Samitto" (Japanese: 世界会議)	Masaki Watanabe	Katsuhiko Chiba	July 3, 2021
With Maam back in the party, Dai and his friends set out for Popp's homeland to look for a sword strong enough for Dai to use, while Leona holds a summit with the world leaders to discuss the creation of a united front against the Dark Lord's Army.
39	"The Landing of Sovereign Rock Castle"; Transliteration: "Kiganjō Dai Jōriku" (Japanese: 鬼岩城大上陸)	Hideaki Ōba	Katsuhiko Chiba	July 10, 2021
By Hadlar's request, Mystvearn sends his troops to Papnica to attack the summit. While Dai waits for his new sword to be forged, the others join the fight to repel the invaders.
40	"Master of Darkness Against His Pupil"; Transliteration: "Yami no Shitei Taiketsu" (Japanese: 闇の師弟対決)	Gaku Yano	Katsuyuki Sumisawa	July 17, 2021
Hyunckel arrives to help and faces his former master, Mystvearn in combat, but despite using all his strength, he is overpowered by the enemy's Dark Aura, until Hyunckel brings forth the power of his own Light Aura.
41	"The Strongest Sword"; Transliteration: "Saikyō no Tsurugi" (Japanese: 最強の剣)	Kazuya Karasawa	Katsuhiko Chiba	July 24, 2021
Dai's Orichalcum Sword is complete and he returns to Papnica to help defend the nation against Mystvearn's invasion.
42	"The Field of Death"; Transliteration: "Shi no Daichi" (Japanese: 死の大地)	Hazuki Omoya	Katsuhiko Chiba	July 31, 2021
With his castle destroyed, a furious Mystvearn attacks the party, but Killvearn, the Demon King's personal assassin and his companion Piroro, stops him. Killvearn provokes Popp and lures him into a trap, but Dai arrives in time to assist his friend.
43	"The Clash of Powerful Swords"; Transliteration: "Saikyō Ken Gekitotsu" (Japanese: 最強剣激突)	Yoshihiro Ueda	Katsuyuki Sumisawa	August 7, 2021
Dai and Popp are ambushed by Hadlar, who returns after having his body upgraded and challenges Dai to a duel.
44	"The Hero Lost in the Glacier"; Transliteration: "Hyōga ni Kieta Dai" (Japanese: 氷河に消えた勇者)	Kayona Yamada	Katsuyuki Sumisawa	August 14, 2021
Dai and Hadlar's clash ends in a draw, but while Hadlar is safely rescued by Mystvearn, Dai's body falls into the sea. Popp is forced to retreat when Killvearn attacks him, and he returns to Papnica where a search party for Dai is established. Meanwhile, the Dark King Vearn commends Hadlar for his feat and reveals himself to him.
45	"The Orichalcum Warrior"; Transliteration: "Oriharukon no Senshi" (Japanese: オリハルコンの戦士)	Hiroyuki Kakudō	Katsuhiko Chiba	August 21, 2021
Popp, Crocodine and Chiu return to the frozen sea to look for Dai. Determined to earn Vearn's approval, Zaboera and his forces attack them, but he is stopped by Hym, one of Hadlar's new subordinates, who is ordered by his master to bring him back.
46	"The Extreme Annihilation Spell, Medroa"; Transliteration: "Kyokudai Shōmetsu Jumon Medorōa" (Japanese: 極大消滅呪文メドローア)	Takayuki Murakami	Katsuhiko Chiba	August 28, 2021
Dai and his companions begin their preparations for the decisive battle against Hadlar and his newly formed team of guardians. To counter the guardians' almost impregnable defense, Popp begins a severely harsh training with Matoriv in order to master the ultimate spell, Frizz Cracker.
47	"To the Final Battleground"; Transliteration: "Iza Kessen no Chi e" (Japanese: いざ決戦の地へ)	Yoshihiro Ueda	Katsuyuki Sumisawa	September 4, 2021
With their training completed, Dai and his friends depart to the Kingdom of Carl for the decisive battle against the Dark Lord's Army. Meanwhile, Vearn sends Killvearn to assassinate Baran, whom he considers a bigger threat than the Disciples of Avan.
48	"The Hadlar Royal Guard"; Transliteration: "Hadorā Shin'ei Kidan" (Japanese: ハドラー親衛騎団)	Hiroaki Miyamoto	Katsuhiko Chiba	September 11, 2021
Nova, son of a general of Ringaia who wants to prove himself as a hero, rushes into battle ahead of Dai's party against Hadlar's Royal Guard who launched a preemptive attack on their allies, but they are astonished when the enemies show a glimpse of their real power.
49	"The Team Battle Begins"; Transliteration: "Pātī Batoru Kaishi" (Japanese: パーティーバトル開始)	Masaki Watanabe	Katsuyuki Sumisawa	September 18, 2021
After regrouping, the Disciples of Avan confront Hadlar's Royal Guard in an all-out battle.
50	"We're the Beast King Commandos"; Transliteration: "Warera Jūō Yūgekitai" (Japanese: 我ら獣王遊撃隊)	Kayona Yamada	Katsuhiko Chiba	September 25, 2021
Separated from the others, Chiu and Gome recruit other monsters to form their own party when they find a secret entrance to the enemy's stronghold.
51	"The Avan Style Ultimate Technique"; Transliteration: "Aban Ryū Kyūkyoku Ōgi" (Japanese: アバン流究極奥義)	Takao Kiriyama	Katsuhiko Chiba	October 2, 2021
Hyunckel, Popp and Crocodine rescue Gome and Chiu. While Popp carries the wounded away to safety, Hyunckel and Crocodine stay behind to dissuade Baran, who is determined to challenge Vearn and his forces alone.
52	"Father and Son Dragons Set Out"; Transliteration: "Oyako Ryū Shutsujin" (Japanese: 父子竜出陣)	Hazuki Omoya	Katsuhiko Chiba	October 9, 2021
Dai and Baran join forces to break the underwater gate to Vearn's fortress, but Fenbren the Bishop, one of Hadlar's Royal Guards stands in their way, while the rest of the party face the other Guards in battle.
53	"Hadlar's Challenge"; Transliteration: "Hadorā no Chōsen" (Japanese: ハドラーの挑戦)	Hiroyuki Kakudō	Katsuhiko Chiba	October 16, 2021
After defeating Fenbren, Dai and Baran break into Vearn's domains where they face Hadlar. During their fight, Baran discovers that the Black Core, a powerful bomb is implanted within Hadlar's body and they must be careful to not detonate it.
54	"Hadlar Versus Baran"; Transliteration: "Hadorā Tai Baran" (Japanese: ハドラー対バラン)	Yoshihiro Ueda	Katsuhiko Chiba	October 23, 2021
Dai and Baran face a huge disadvantage out of concern with the Black Core within Hadlar's body. Baran comes with his own plan to defeat Hadlar and contain the core's detonation, but fails, which leads to Dai being severely wounded.
55	"The Black Core"; Transliteration: "Kuro no Koa" (Japanese: 黒の核晶)	Kayona Yamada	Katsuyuki Sumisawa	October 30, 2021
To protect his son, Baran puts Dai to sleep and fights Hadlar barehanded, but fails to prevent Hadlar's Black Core from exploding, obliterating the Fields of Death and revealing the true form of Vearn's palace.
56	"The Inherited Heart"; Transliteration: "Uketsugareru Kokoro" (Japanese: 受け継がれる心)	Hideaki Ōba	Katsuyuki Sumisawa	November 6, 2021
Following Baran's sacrifice, Dai and his friends regroup and come face to face with Vearn himself.
57	"The God of The Underworld"; Transliteration: "Makai no Kami" (Japanese: 魔界の神)	Gaku Yano	Katsuhiko Chiba	November 13, 2021
Dai and the others fight the Dark King Vearn who despite facing them alone, easily overpowers the party.
58	"The Unlikely Savior"; Transliteration: "Igai na Kyūseishu" (Japanese: 意外な救世主)	Kazuya Karasawa	Katsuhiko Chiba	November 20, 2021
In recognition for Dai's bravery, Vearn decides to fight him seriously and defeats him. However, when the Dark King is about to wipe out the party, Hadlar appears to challenge him, rescuing them in the occasion.
59	"The Survivors"; Transliteration: "Seizonsha-tachi" (Japanese: 生存者たち)	Michiru Itabisashi	Katsuhiko Chiba	November 27, 2021
The party is scattered after they barely escape with their lives from Vearn Palace. While Popp and Maam are washed up at the coast of the Carl Kingdom, Dai is taken by the Holy Mother Dragon, who declares that the lineage of the Dragon Knights is over, but Baran's spirit appears and convinces her to give him another chance.
60	"Dai and Popp"; Transliteration: "Dai to Poppu" (Japanese: ダイとポップ)	Hiroaki Miyamoto	Katsuhiko Chiba	December 4, 2021
Vearn begins his plan to destroy the surface world and declares that Hyunckel and Crocodine will soon be executed for opposing him. Dai is worried that he may not be strong enough to stop the Dark King, but Popp approaches his friend to encourage him.
61	"Avan, the Hero"; Transliteration: "Yūsha Aban" (Japanese: 勇者アバン)	Hiroyuki Kakudō	Katsuyuki Sumisawa	December 11, 2021
A short story featuring Avan's youth as a member of Carl's knights under Queen Flora's when he first met the Dark Lord Hadlar, beginning his path to becoming a hero.
62	"The Cave of Trials"; Transliteration: "Haja no Dōkutsu" (Japanese: 破邪の洞窟)	Yoshihiro Ueda	Katsuhiko Chiba	December 18, 2021
Accompanied by Queen Flora, Maam and Merle, Leona delves into an ancient labyrinth in order to learn a powerful spell that will let them reach Vearn's palace. Meanwhile, Popp begins doubting if he is worthy of being considered one of Avan's disciples.
63	"The Sacred Inheritance"; Transliteration: "Seinaru Keishō" (Japanese: 聖なる継承)	Kayona Yamada	Katsuhiko Chiba	December 25, 2021
Leona's party fight powerful monsters at the bottom of the labyrinth to protect her while the ritual is performed. Meanwhile, Dai returns with a new, powerful technique and Popp still struggles with his own insecurities, seeking Matoriv's advice.
64	"The Night Before the Battle"; Transliteration: "Kessen Zen'ya" (Japanese: 決戦前夜)	Tomohisa Onoue; Ōtsuka Jin	Katsuhiko Chiba	January 8, 2022
Lon Berk meets Dai and the others again, bringing Dai and Hyunckel's repaired weapons, along new special weapons he made for the rest of the party, as they prepare for the decisive battle against Vearn.
65	"The Dark Hyunckel"; Transliteration: "Ankoku no Hyunkeru" (Japanese: 暗黒のヒュンケル)	Takao Kiriyama	Katsuyuki Sumisawa	January 15, 2022
Hyunckel and Crocodine are brought to the site of their execution. Mystvearn makes one final attempt to bring his former disciple back to his side by corrupting Hyunckel's body with dark magic, but fails.
66	"The Five Colors of Light"; Transliteration: "Goshiki no Hikari" (Japanese: 五色の光)	Kotoe Miki	Katsuhiko Chiba	January 22, 2022
Reunited at last, the five Disciples of Avan begin the magic ritual of purification, but are vulnerable until it is complete. Mystvearn attempts to stop them, but Lon Berk and the rest of their allies make a stand to protect them.
67	"The Peril of the Great Purification Spell"; Transliteration: "Minakatōru no Kiki" (Japanese: 大破邪呪文(ミナカトール)の危機)	Kayona Yamada	Katsuhiko Chiba	January 29, 2022
The ritual of purification is about to fail because of Popp being unable to power up his insignia, while Zaboera appears and lays open his trap, throwing a horde of monsters upon the warriors defending the party and attempting to kill Popp with a poisoned dagger, but Merle puts herself in harm's way to protect him.
68	"The Last Challenge"; Transliteration: "Saigo no Chōsen" (Japanese: 最後の挑戦)	Hazuki Omoya	Shin Yoshida	February 5, 2022
Having successfully performed the ritual of purification, the Disciples of Avan return to Vearn's palace to confront him, but instead, they meet Hadlar and his subordinates, who challenge the party for one last battle. Dai accepts Hadlar's request for a duel while his friends face the remaining members of the Royal Guard.
69	"The Clash of Love"; Transliteration: "Ai no Chō Gekitotsu" (Japanese: 愛の超激突)	Yoshihiro Ueda	Shin Yoshida	February 12, 2022
Popp fights Sigma the Knight and Hyunckel has another fight with Hym the Pawn, while Maam is attacked by Albinass the Queen, who fights with all her might for the sake of her master, despite Maam's attempts to dissuade her.
70	"Victory or Annihilation"; Transliteration: "Shōri ka Shōmetsu ka" (Japanese: 勝利か消滅か)	Gaku Yano	Katsuyuki Sumisawa	February 19, 2022
Popp has a hard fight with Sigma, but wins after outsmarting the enemy. After the battle, Popp and Maam finally manage to talk about their feelings for each other.
71	"Battle of True Dragons"; Transliteration: "Shinryū no Tatakai" (Japanese: 真竜の闘い)	Michiru Itabisashi	Katsuhiko Chiba	February 26, 2022
With all of the Royal Guard defeated, Dai's companions watch from afar as he reveals the results of his training in the decisive duel with Hadlar.
72	"The Last Attack"; Transliteration: "Saigo no Hitotachi" (Japanese: 最後の一太刀)	Kazuya Karasawa	Katsuhiko Chiba	March 5, 2022
After an exhaustive battle, Dai prevails against Hadlar. However, Killvearn takes advantage of their condition and unleashes a mortal trap that engulfs them in magical flames that do not kill them instantly thanks to Popp's intervention. The others look for a way to rescue them, but to no avail.
73	"The Hope in the Flames"; Transliteration: "Honō no Naka no Kibō" (Japanese: 炎の中の希望)	Hiroaki Miyamoto	Katsuhiko Chiba	April 16, 2022 (Note: Episode 73 was originally scheduled to air on March 12, 2022, but the series' entire schedule was subsequently delayed until April 16, 2022 after Toei Animation revealed their internal servers had been hacked by an unauthorized third party.)
Dai, Hadlar and Popp are about to be incinerated by Killvearn's trap. Recognizing Popp's determination to protect his friend, Hadlar musters the rest of his life force to help him. When his trap fails, Killvearn appears to execute them personally, but is stopped by Avan, who was supposed to be dead, but returns to help his disciples.
74	"Return of the Great Hero"; Transliteration: "Dai Yūsha no Fukkatsu" (Japanese: 大勇者の復活)	Hideaki Ōba	Shin Yoshida	April 23, 2022
Following Hadlar's death and Avan's surprising return, Dai and his companions push forward through Vearn Palace, while Avan stays behind to confront Killvearn.
75	"The Secret of Breach"; Transliteration: "Haja no Hihō" (Japanese: 破邪の秘法)	Yoshihiro Ueda	Katsuyuki Sumisawa	April 30, 2022
With Hyunckel staying at the rearguard, Avan and the rest of his disciples reach the main gates of Vearn Palace. In the occasion, Avan reveals what he was doing since his fight with Hadlar on Dermine Island. Meanwhile, Killvearn and Piroro prepare for their revenge against Avan by replacing the mask that the latter had cut off from him.
76	"Justice's March"; Transliteration: "Seigi no Kaishingeki" (Japanese: 正義の快進撃)	Hazuki Omoya	Katsuhiko Chiba	May 7, 2022
Dai and his friends make their final preparations for the showdown with Vearn, while their allies who fight at the surface corner Zaboera, who unveils his final trump card.
77	"Another Hero"; Transliteration: "Mō Hitori no Yūsha" (Japanese: もうひとりの勇者)	Kōji Ogawa	Shin Yoshida	May 14, 2022
Crocodine and the others are overwhelmed by Zaboera's transformated state, when Nova and Lon Berk decide to bet their own lives to defeat him.
78	"The Survivor from Hell"; Transliteration: "Jigoku Kara no Seikansha" (Japanese: 地獄からの生還者)	Fumihiko Suganuma	Katsuyuki Sumisawa	May 21, 2022
While the battle on the surface finally ends with Zaboera's death, Hyunckel fights an endless horde of monsters alone to protect the rest of the party, when suddenly Hym, who had fused with Hadlar's soul and became stronger, returns to have a rematch with him.
79	"The Silver Hair Hym"; Transliteration: "Ginpatsu no Himu" (Japanese: 銀髪のヒム)	Tomohisa Onoue	Katsuhiko Chiba	May 28, 2022
Hym overpowers an exhausted Hyunckel, who decides to muster all his power into a single blow to have a chance at defeating him.
80	"Checkmate"; Transliteration: "Chekkumeito" (Japanese: チェックメイト)	Takao Kiriyama	Katsuhiko Chiba	June 4, 2022
Maximum, the king of Vearn's orichalcum soldiers, appear to dispose of Hyunckel and Hym, who are exhausted from their duel, but Hyunckel refuses to give up and fights the attackers unarmed.
81	"The Duel in the White Garden"; Transliteration: "Howaito Gāden no Kettō" (Japanese: ホワイトガーデンの決闘)	Yoshihiro Ueda	Shin Yoshida	June 11, 2022
Hym and Hyunckel are rescued by Lahart, who was revived by Baran and returned to assist the party. Meanwhile, Dai and the others are confronted by Mystvearn and Killvearn drags Avan away for a duel to the death.
82	"The Successor of Justice"; Transliteration: "Seigi no Kōkeisha" (Japanese: 正義の後継者)	Gaku Yano	Katsuyuki Sumisawa	June 18, 2022
Avan continues his duel with Killvearn, while Leona reveals her plan to escort Dai to his duel with Vearn. To accomplish this, Popp and Maam stay behind to face Mystvearn.
83	"Baran's Testament"; Transliteration: "Baran no Yuigon" (Japanese: バランの遺言)	Kayona Yamada	Shin Yoshida	June 25, 2022
Lahart arrives to assist Popp and Maam, revealing to Dai his father's final message to him. In response, Dai complies with his friends' request and rushes to face Vearn, accompanied by Leona.
84	"Stand Up, The Fate of Knight"; Transliteration: "Tate, Shukumei no Kishi" (Japanese: 起て、宿命の騎士)	Hiroaki Miyamoto	Katsuyuki Sumisawa	July 2, 2022
Leona is captured by a massive, biomechanical creature who powers up Vearn Palace. Overwhelmed at first by Goroa and the Magic Furnace, Dai unlocks the power of the Dragon Crest inherited from his father, combined with his to unlock his full potential.
85	"The Dark King Vearn"; Transliteration: "Daimaō Bān" (Japanese: 大魔王バーン)	Kotoe Miki	Katsuhiko Chiba	July 9, 2022
Dai's second fight with Vearn begins. In the occasion, Vearn's suspicions are confirmed when the Dragon Crest inherited from Baran imbues Dai not only with the power, but also the combat experience of his Dragon Knight predecessors as well.
86	"Killvearn's Trap"; Transliteration: "Kirubān no Wana" (Japanese: キルバーンの罠)	Hazuki Omoya	Katsuhiko Chiba	July 16, 2022
Dai gains the upper hand against Vearn, while Hym steps in to challenge Mystvearn and Killvearn's duel with Avan reaches its conclusion.
87	"The Decisive Attack"; Transliteration: "Shōbu o Kaketa Kōgeki" (Japanese: 勝負をかけた攻撃)	Yoshihiro Ueda	Katsuhiko Chiba	July 23, 2022
Hym overpowers Mystvearn, but Hyunckel and the others are doubtful if they should just kill him, or discover his true identity before it. Meanwhile, Dai and Vearn's battle comes to an end.
88	"The Dark Clothing"; Transliteration: "Yami no Koromo" (Japanese: 闇の衣)	Takao Kiriyama	Shin Yoshida	July 30, 2022
Dai and Leona recover after Vearn was defeated and apparently killed. Meanwhile, Mystvearn removes his robe, revealing his identity and the true extension of his powers.
89	"The Secret Method of Freezing Time"; Transliteration: "Kōreru Toki no Hihō" (Japanese: 凍れる時間の秘法)	Yūna Hirosue	Katsuyuki Sumisawa	August 6, 2022
Against the overwhelming power of Mystvearn, Brokeena fights the enemy to make an opening for Popp to strike him with his most powerful spell. In the occasion, Brokeena deduces the secret behind the enemy's seemingly indestructible body.
90	"Mist and Kill"; Transliteration: "Misuto to Kiru" (Japanese: 影と死神)	Kokoro Kondō	Katsuhiko Chiba	August 13, 2022
With Brokeena and Popp seemingly killed, the party loses all hope of defeating Mystvearn. In the occasion, Hyunckel discovers Mystvearn's greatest secret and Avan returns to assist them, having triumphed over Killvearn.
91	"Vearn's Truth"; Transliteration: "Bān no Shinjitsu" (Japanese: バーンの真実)	Gaku Yano	Katsuhiko Chiba	August 20, 2022
With all his subordinates defeated, Vearn shows his real appearance by fusing with his original body. Meanwhile, Myst, the monster which was possessing it and passing off as Mystvearn, takes control of Maam's body and attacks the party.
92	"The Attitude of Heaven and Earth Battle"; Transliteration: "Tenchimatō no Kamae" (Japanese: 天地魔闘の構え)	Hazuki Omoya	Shin Yoshida	August 27, 2022
Myst possesses Hyunckel's body, but Hyunckel erases him with the power of his own Light Aura. Meanwhile, Dai begins his fight with a fully restored Vearn, and is overwhelmed by him.
93	"The Jewel of the Eye"; Transliteration: "Hitomi no Hōgyoku" (Japanese: 瞳の宝玉)	Kayona Yamada	Katsuhiko Chiba	September 3, 2022
Vearn attempts to convince Leona to join his side in order to make Dai angry, when Avan and the others arrive to help.
94	"Running on Bonds"; Transliteration: "Kizuna ni Kakete" (Japanese: 絆にかけて)	Kotoe Miki	Katsuyuki Sumisawa	September 10, 2022
All members of the party are incapacitated, except for Dai and Popp. After analyzing the secret behind Vearn's ultimate technique, Popp comes up with a plan to create an opening for Dai to deal the finishing blow.
95	"The Biggest and Last Reversal"; Transliteration: "Saidai Saigo no Gyakuten" (Japanese: 最大最後の逆転)	Yoshihiro Ueda	Katsuhiko Chiba	September 17, 2022
Dai breaks through Vearn's defense and attacks him directly, but the Dark King reveals his master plan, which involves obliterating the entire surface world using six Black Cores he sent throughout the world, the last one dropped over his companions at the surface, apparently killing them.
96	"Like a Flash"; Transliteration: "Senkō no Yō ni" (Japanese: 閃光のように)	Takao Kiriyama	Shin Yoshida	September 24, 2022
With the Black Cores minutes away from exploding, Dai loses all will to fight, certain that killing Vearn at that point would be pointless, until Popp learns from Merle that she and the others survived thanks to her foresight and are working together to stop the bombs.
97	"The Tear of God"; Transliteration: "Kami no Namida" (Japanese: 神の涙)	Yūta Tanaka	Katsuhiko Chiba	October 1, 2022
Despite being exhausted, Dai and Popp keep attacking Vearn, until Vearn discovers that Gome, who was always by Dai's side is actually a legendary artifact sent by the gods. Vearn destroys Gome in front of Dai, but before vanishing, Gome reveals to Dai the reason why he became his friend and performs one last miracle.
98	"Dai's Decision"; Transliteration: "Dai no Ketsudan" (Japanese: ダイの決断)	Hiroaki Miyamoto	Katsuhiko Chiba	October 8, 2022
Thanks to Gome's sacrifice, the humans on the surface work together and stop the Black Cores from exploding, but Vearn refuses to give up. To defeat the Demon King once and for all, Dai unlocks the full power of both his crests to transform into a Dragonoid, despite knowing that he may lose his mind in the process.
99	"Victory with These Arms"; Transliteration: "Kono Ude de Shōri o" (Japanese: この腕で勝利を)	Kazuya Karasawa	Katsuhiko Chiba	October 15, 2022
Popp and the others fight for their lives to escape Vearn Palace. Meanwhile, Vearn also unleashes his maximum power, transforming permanently into a monster on par with Dai's own transformation.
100	"Farewell! The Beloved Earth"; Transliteration: "Saraba! Aisuru Chijō yo" (Japanese: さらば！愛する地上よ)	Kazuya Karasawa	Katsuhiko Chiba	October 22, 2022
After a long fight, Dai destroys Vearn for good and returns to his friends, but their celebration is cut short when Piroro reveals himself as Killvearn's real identity and attempts to kill them with a Black Core, forcing Dai to sacrifice himself to save the world.

== Home media release ==
=== Japanese ===
Avex Pictures (Region 2, Blu-ray & DVD)
Volume	Episodes	Release date	Ref.
1	1–13	January 29, 2021	
2	14–25	April 30, 2021	
3	26–37	July 30, 2021	
4	38–50	October 29, 2021	
5	51–62	January 28, 2022	
6	63–74	May 27, 2022	
7	75–87	August 26, 2022	
8	88–100	November 25, 2022	

== See also ==
- List of Dragon Quest: The Adventure of Dai characters
- List of Dragon Quest: The Adventure of Dai volumes
