= List of Dragon Quest: The Adventure of Dai volumes =

First tankōbon volume cover

Dragon Quest: The Adventure of Dai is a Japanese manga series written by Riku Sanjo and illustrated by Koji Inada. A short story Gush! Gulp! (デルパ!イルイル!, Derupa! Iruiru!) was first released in the 25th and 26th issues of Weekly Shōnen Jump in 1989. Issues 35–37 included the short story Dai o' Might!!! (ダイ爆発!!!, Dai Bakuhatsu!!!). The serialization of The Adventure of Dai began that same year in the 45th issue of Weekly Shōnen Jump, published on October 23. It continued on for seven years before ending in the 52nd issue of Weekly Shōnen Jump on December 9, 1996. The manga was collected into 37 tankōbon volumes published between March 9, 1990, and June 4, 1997. It was later released in 22 bunkoban volumes published from June 18, 2003, to March 18, 2004. A 25-volume edition that includes the color pages from its original magazine run and newly drawn covers by Inada was published between October 2, 2020, and July 2, 2021.

On July 9, 2021, Viz Media announced they licensed the series for English publication. The first volume was released on March 1, 2022; the fifth and latest volume was released on November 8 of that same year.

A prequel manga series illustrated by Yūsaku Shibata, with Sanjo credited for original work, began serializing in Shueisha's V Jump manga magazine in the November issue on September 19, 2020. The series is centered around Avan before he met Dai and his companions.

A spin-off manga written and illustrated by Yoshikazu Amami, titled Dragon Quest: The Adventure of Dai – Xross Blade, was serialized in Shueisha's Saikyō Jump magazine from October 1, 2020, to January 4, 2024, and collected in seven volumes. It is based on the October 2020 video game of the same name.

== Volumes ==
=== Original release ===
No.	Title	Release date	ISBN
01	The Hero's Tutor!! Yūsha no Kateikyōshi!! (勇者の家庭教師!!)	March 9, 1990	978-4-08-871071-6
01. "Gush! Gulp! (Part 1)" (デルバ!イルイル!(前編), Derupa! Iruiru! (Zenpen)); 02. "Gush! Gulp! (Part 2)" (デルバ!イルイル!(後編), Derupa! Iruiru! (Kōhen)); 03. "Dai o' Might!!! (Part 1)" (ダイ爆発!!!(前編), Dai Bakuhatsu!!! (Zenpen)); 04. "Dai o' Might!!! (Part 2)" (ダイ爆発!!!(中編), Dai Bakuhatsu!!! (Chūhen)); 05. "Dai o' Might!!! (Part 3)" (ダイ爆発!!!(後編), Dai Bakuhatsu!!! (Kōhen)); 06. "The Hero's Tutor!!" (勇者の家庭教師!!, Yūsha no Kateikyōshi!!); 07. "Dai's Special Training!!!" (ダイ特訓!!!, Dai Tokkun!!!); 08. "The Dragon Who Wore Glasses!" (メガネをかけた竜!, Megane o Kaketa Ryū!); 09. "The Dark Lord Reappears...!?" (魔王の出現...!?, Maō no Shutsugen...!?)
Fifteen years ago, a great hero defeated Hadlar, the Demon King who terrorized the world. His monsters, freed from his control, went to live on the island of Dermline, where a little boy named Dai was raised by Brass. Dai dreams of becoming a hero, while Brass wants to make him a wizard, even though he is no good at magic. A band of false heroes in search of glory arrives on the island and kidnaps Gome, a monster close friend of Dai, who heads to the kingdom of Romos from which the criminals come to recover him. With the help of other monsters, Dai saves Gome and also gains the friendship of the king of Romos himself. A few weeks later, Princess Leona, from the kingdom of Papnica, arrives on the island to be baptized, but her subjects try to kill her. To protect her, Dai awakens a mysterious force that enables him to use magic and defeats enemies. Afterwards, the monsters on the island suddenly turn violent and Brass urges Dai to leave the island as he is afraid of killing him with his own hands. At that moment, Avan De Zinuar III arrives on the island (with his disciple Popp), who uses a spell to protect the island from evil forces and announces that he has been sent by Leona's family to make Dai a hero and allow him to defeat Hadlar, who was resurrected. Dai agrees to undergo Avan's special training, during which they are interrupted by the arrival of Hadlar himself.
02	Battle!! Hadlar versus Avan; Taiketsu!! Hadorā Tai Aban (対決!!ハドラー対アバン)	April 10, 1990	978-4-08-871072-3
10. "Hadlar's Identity...!!" (ハドラーの正体...!!, Hadorā no Shōtai...!!); 11. "Battle!! Hadlar versus Avan" (対決!!ハドラー対アバン, Taiketsu!! Hadorā Tai Aban); 12. "The Insignia of Avan" (アバンのしるし, Aban no Shirushi); 13. "Dai's Rage!!!" (ダイ激怒!!!, Dai Gekido!!!); 14. "Explosion!! Strash" (爆発!! 最強技, Bakuhatsu!! Sutorasshu); 15. "The Journey to Epic Adventure!!" (大冒険への旅立ち!!, Daibōken e no Tabidachi!!); 16. "Maam of the Magic Forest" (魔の森のマァム, Ma no Mori no Māmu); 17. "The Beast King!! Crocodine" (獣王!!クロコダイン, Jū Ō!! Kurokodain); 18. "The Beast King's War Cry" (獣王のおたけび!!, Jū Ō no Otakebi!!)
Avan is the great hero who defeated Hadler fifteen years ago. Face-to-face again, the two face off and Hadlar reveals that he was resurrected by The Dark King Vearn. After entrusting his pupils with the task of defeating The Dark King, Avan sacrifices himself against Hadlar. Furious at his master's death, Dai awakens his strength and forces Hadlar to retreat, who recognizes him as the "Dragon Knight". Back at the Demon stronghold, Hadlar reports to Vearn what has happened and orders all of his troops to kill Dai before he becomes too great a threat. On their way to the kingdom of Romos, in the demonic forest Dai and Popp rescue a little girl and meet Maam, a warrior who invites them to their village. The two refuse but lose Gome, who is picked up by Maam. In the forest, Dai and Popp are faced with Crocodine, one of the six commanders of Hadlar's demon army. Popp runs away as Dai tries to confront him.
03	Gather!! The Disciples of Avan; Tsudoe!! Aban no Shito (集え!!アバンの使徒)	August 8, 1990	978-4-08-871073-0
19. "Gather!! The Disciples of Avan" (集え!!アバンの使徒, Tsudoe!! Aban no Shito); 20. "The Miracle Magic Bullet Gun" (驚異の魔弾銃, Kyōi no Madangan); 21. "Avan, Our Teacher" (アバン・我らが師, Aban Warera ga Shi); 22. "3rd Companion!!" (第3の仲間!!, Daisan no Nakama!!); 23. "Romos, Crisis Draws Near" (危機迫るロモス, Kiki Semaru Romosu); 24. "Attack of the Hundred Beast Army" (百獣総進撃!!, Hyakujū Sōshingeki!!); 25. "Dai's Weak Point...!?" (ダイの弱点...!?, Dai no Jakuten...!?); 26. "Foul Play! The Ghost Bishop" (卑劣なり! 妖魔司教, Hiretsu nari! Yōma Shikyō); 27. "A Fragment of Courage!" (ひとかけらの勇気!, Hito Kakera no Yūki!)
Maam once again saves Popp, who realizes that she too is a disciple of Avan. Both then come to Dai's rescue against Crocodine, who retreats after losing his left eye, promising revenge. The whole team thus returns to the village, where they meet Leira, Maam's mother and member of Avan's team that had defeated Hadlar fifteen years earlier. Dai then decides to have the village patriarch train him in the use of spells and informs him of the master's death. Meanwhile, Crocodine is egged on by Zaboera, another of the six commanders, who hands him a magic box. The next day, Maam joins Dai, Popp and Gome to head to Romos Castle. At an inn, they meet the false hero gang Deroline, Zulpon, Heroh Heroh and Masopho. In the morning, Crocodine attacks the king's castle to lure Dai away. Fearful of death, Popp gives up and confesses he doesn't want to fight. Disappointed, Maam scolds him and leaves for the castle alone. Crocodine resorts to the help given to him by Zaboera and frees the monster that was inside: Brass, now subjugated. Dai finds herself in trouble, unwilling to harm her grandfather, while Maam is captured by the demon eye in the service of Zaboera. Meanwhile Popp, consumed with shame, has a kind of foreboding but is too scared to go into battle. However, Masopho's encouragement convinces him to rush to the castle, where he challenges Crocodine to avenge his friends.
04	The Gathering of the 6 Commanders...!? Roku Daidanchō Shūketsu...!? (6大団長集結...!?)	November 11, 1990	978-4-08-871074-7
28. "Popp! Risk your Life!!" (ポップ!生命をかけろ!!, Poppu! Inochi o Kakero!!); 29. "The Miracle of Friendship" (奇跡呼ぶ友情, Kiseki Yobu Yūjō); 30. "Dai, Crest of Anger!!" (ダイ怒りの紋章!!, Dai Ikari no Monshō!!); 31. "Small Heroes" (小さな勇者たち, Chiisana Yūshatachi); 32. "Aim for Papnica!" (パプニカをめざせ!, Papunika o Mezase!); 33. "The Gathering of the 6 Commanders...!?" (6大団長集結...!?, Roku Daidanchō Shūketsu...!?); 34. "The Mysterious Swordmaster" (謎の剛剣士, Nazo no Gōkenshi); 35. "The Mystic Swordsman, Hyunckel!!" (魔剣戦士ヒュンケル!!, Maken Senshi Hyunkeru!!); 36. "His Father's Enemy...Avan!?" (父の敵...アバン!?, Chichi no Kataki... Aban!?); 37. "The Strongest Black Sword!!" (黒き最強剣!!, Kuroki Saikyō Ken!!)
Having no chance against Crocodine, Popp uses his last strength to cast the same spell as Avan and thus free Brass. Crocodine is moved by this courageous gesture but, pushed by Zaboera, he prepares to kill Popp. It is then that Gome, hovering above the wounded Dai, shines brightly and Dai's wounds heal. Crocodine is defeated by Dai's Avan Strash and, badly wounded, expresses regret for having used an unfair tactic, before throwing himself from the top of the tower, ending his army's attack on the kingdom of Romos. As Crocodine is retrieved by the demonic army to attempt to save him, Hadlar gathers the remaining army commanders but regrets, however, that the leader of the immortals is not present, having been sent by The Dark King Vearn himself to deal with Dai's team . This has meanwhile come to the kingdom of Papnica, which was devastated by the army of immortals. Leona is nowhere to be found but they meet Hyunckel, Avan's first disciple and now commander of the army of immortals. Raised by a soldier of Hadlar, he harbors a visceral hatred towards Avan for the death of his father. Hyunckel takes on the three boys and uses armor that is immune to all spells. The team of heroes find themselves in trouble but Dai realizes that the armor has a weak point that allows his face to be seen and hits Hyunckel in his face.
05	The Lightning Sword of Justice!!! Seigi no Inazuma Ken!!! (正義の稲妻剣!!!)	February 8, 1991	978-4-08-871075-4
38. "The Absolute End...!!" (絶体絶命...!!, Zettai Zetsumei...!!); 39. "The Beast King's Tears" (獣王の涙, Jū Ō no Namida); 40. "This Is The Underground Demon Castle!" (これが地底魔城だ!, Kore ga Chitei Majō da!); 41. "Bet It On A Lightning Strike!" (稲妻にかけろ!, Inazuma ni Kakero!); 42. "Sneaking In! The Dungeon of Death" (潜入!死の迷宮, Sennyū! Shi no Danjon); 43. "The Decisive Moment...!!" (決着の瞬間...!!, Ketchaku no Toki...!!); 44. "Dai, To Die By The Demonic Sword...!!?" (ダイ、魔剣に死す...!!?, Dai, Maken ni Shisu...!!?); 45. "Father's Soul!!" (父の魂!!, Chichi no Tamashii!!); 46. "The Lightning Sword of Justice!!!" (正義の稲妻剣!!!, Seigi no Inazuma Ken!!!); 47. "Farewell, Lonely Soldier" (さらば孤独の戦士, Saraba Kodoku no Senshi)
Hyunckel defeats Dai but, as he is about to finish him off, is stopped by Crocodine, who allows Dai and Popp to escape with his beasts. Crocodine explains that he understood the true essence of humans thanks to Dai and begs Hyunckel to redeem himself but Hyunckel shoots him down and captures Maam to use as bait. Hadler visits him and Hyunckel denies seeing Crocodine (to whom he is providing healing treatment instead). Meanwhile Dai and Pop meet Baduck, Princess Leona's bodyguard, whom they have lost sight of. The two students devise a strategy: Popp will use a spell to make the clouds appear and Dai will use Raiden to attack Hyunckel, as his armor does not counteract electricity. The next day, they return to Hyunckel's headquarters but are led into a trap. Meanwhile, Maam overhears the soldiers discussing the trap set and manages to escape with the help of Gome. Dai and Popp finally find themselves facing Hyunckel, in an open-air arena. Their strategy is successful but Hyunckel survives and delivers a fatal blow to Dai with his secret technique. Maam joins them and gives Hyunckel an object that he found in a secret cache, containing the last message from Hyunckel's father, which reveals that it was actually Hadlar who killed him and not Avan. However, Hyunckel refuses to believe it and is about to finish them off. Despite being unconscious, Dai gets up and resumes the fight, combining magic and technique with the sword and finally defeats Hyunckel by combining the technique of Raiden and Avan Strash. Hyunckel redeems himself but Commander Flazzard appears, awakening the volcano located under the headquarters. Hyunckel therefore sacrifices himself to save the others. The commanders of the armies of evil meet again and Flazzard requests that he be assigned the attack on Papnica.
06	Cruelty! Flazzard; Zankoku! Fureizādo (残酷!フレイザード)	April 10, 1991	978-4-08-871076-1
48. "The Flare Signal" (合図の信号弾, Aizu no Shingōdan); 49. "Where's Leona......!?" (その時、レオナは......!?, Sono toki, Reona wa......!?); 50. "Cruelty! Flazzard" (残酷!フレイザード, Zankoku! Fureizādo); 51. "The Hero VS The Fire and Ice General!!" (勇者対氷炎将軍!!, Yūsha Tai Hyōen Shōgun!!); 52. "Terrifying Magic Barrier!!" (恐怖の結界呪法!!, Kyōfu no Kekkai Juhō!!); 53. "Frozen Beauty, Leona!" (凍れる美女・レオナ!, Kōreru Bijo Reona!); 54. "The Rumored Great Magician" (噂の大魔道士, Uwasa no Dai Madōshi); 55. "Matoriv's Special Training" (マトリフの特訓, Matorifu no Tokkun); 56. "Set Off For Valge Island" (バルジ島へ上陸せよ, Baruji-tō e Jōriku se yo)
Dai, Popp, Maam, Gome and Baduck, looking for Leona, meet Aimi, one of the three wise men of Papnica. She informs them that Leona is on Valge Island's tower, isolated by a vortex. The whole team goes there in a hot air balloon but Flazzard also arrives and attacks the group. Dai puts the enemy in difficulty, who then resorts to a secret technique that cancels other people's spells and reduces their strength with two towers, made of ice and fire. Seeing the situation escalating, Maam suggests the group to flee. To prevent this, Flazzard casts a freezing spell on Leona but the group flees anyway. Flazzard's soldiers attack them but are annihilated by Matoriv, a great wizard who belonged to Avan's team along with Maam's parents. The group regroups to counter Flazzard's barrier and be able to save Leona: while Baduck produces explosives to destroy the two towers, Dai trains with Maam and Popp with Matoriv, who teaches him a displacement spell. Meanwhile, Hadlar announces to his army a general offensive against the heroes but orders Commander Baran to go and bring Carl's country to its knees, causing Carl to suspect he wants to prevent him from meeting with Dai. Flazzard then warns the whole team that Leona, in the ice, will not survive more than a few hours. The group then leaves for Valge, where the armies of shadows and magicians await them.
07	Immortal Saviour!!! Fujimi no Kyūseishu!!! (不死身の救世主!!!)	July 10, 1991	978-4-08-871077-8
57. "The Dark Army Wages a Full-Scale Attack!!!" (魔王軍総攻撃!!!, Maōgun Sōkōgeki!!!); 58. "A Heated Struggle to the Death!!" (超高熱の死闘!!, Chōkōnetsu no Shitō!!); 59. "Immortal Saviour!!!" (不死身の救世主!!!, Fujimi no Kyūseishu!!!); 60. "Warrior Revived!!" (戦士復活!!, Senshi Fukkatsu!!); 61. "Clash!! Hyunckel VS Hadlar" (激突!!ヒュンケル対ハドラー, Gekitotsu!! Hyunkeru Tai Hadorā); 62. "Roaring Flames, Final Touki!!" (火を吹く最終闘気!!, Hi o Fuku Saishū Tōki!!); 63. "The Cross of Life and Death" (生と死の十字架, Sei to Shi no Kurusu); 64. "Infiltration!! Save Leona" (突入!!レオナを救え, Totsunyū!! Reona o Sukue); 65. "Flazzard's Tenacity" (フレイザードの執念, Fureizādo no Shūnen); 66. "Hailstorm of Stones!!!" (嵐の弾岩!!!, Arashi no Dangan!!!)
Dai, Gome and Baduck fall into the enemy trap but are saved by Crocodine. Meanwhile, Popp and Maam come face to face with Hadlar himself. Although he can't compete with him, Popp doesn't give up and manages to stand up to him. However, when Hadlar is about to kill Maam, Hyunckel saves her and destroys one of the enemy towers, revealing that he was cured by Crocodine, who then convinced him to help Dai of her. Hyunckel then confronts Hadler to settle the score, managing to defeat him at the cost of his own life energy, however Hadlar's body is not found. Crocodine routs the army of wizards and shadows but is unable to stop Zaboera from escaping. Dai and his friends arrive at the foot of Valge's tower, where they defeat the Ice and Fire Soldiers but are taken aback by Flazzard. The arrival of Crocodine and Hyunckel forces Flazzard to resort to his secret technique: the explosion of fire and ice, which could cost him his life. The monster thus explains that his only goal is glory, having no past since created by Hadlar just a year earlier. Facing Flazzard's violent attack, Dai remembers Avan's teaching and challenges Flazzard, telling him that he too will use his ultimate technique.
08	Now...Slice Everything...!!! Ima... Subete o Kiru...!!! (いま...すべてを斬る...!!!)	October 9, 1991	978-4-08-871078-5
67. "The Final Secret of Avan Style" (アバン流最後の奥義, Aban Ryū Saigo no Ōgi); 68. "The Sky Slash Appears!!" (出たっ!! 空裂斬, Deta—!! Kūretsuzan); 69. "Giant Flame Man!!!" (魔炎気の巨人!!!, Maenki no Kyojin!!!); 70. "Now... Slice Everything...!!!" (いま...すべてを斬る...!!!, Ima... Subete o Kiru...!!!); 71. "Goodbye, Magic Bullet Gun" (さよなら魔弾銃, Sayonara Madangan); 72. "Victory! And Now..." (勝利!そして..., Shōri! Soshite...); 73. "Maam's Decision" (マァムの決意, Māmu no Ketsui); 74. "Shaking Kiganjou...!!" (揺れる鬼岩城...!!, Yureru Kiganjō...!!); 75. "Until The Day We Meet Again" (また会う日まで, Mata Au Hi Made)
Dai locates and destroys the core of Flazzard, whose two parts of ice and fire can no longer coexist and is forced to split apart. Popp then uses Begirama to destroy the ice half, while the fire half accepts Mystvearn's offer to become his underling in exchange for the most powerful armor in the demon army. Despite his newfound power, Flazzard is defeated by Dai, now able to cut through the sky and make full use of the Avan strash. Flazzard begs Mystvearn for another chance but Mystvearn just crushes him and retreats. The entire team then rushes to Valge's tower to rescue Leona, whose ice hasn't melted yet. Maam therefore decides to use his magic gun, loading several spells into the same bullet, and in this way frees Leona, at the cost of destroying the gun. In Papnica, the inhabitants return to normal following the defeat of the evil armies. Hyunckel asks Leona to judge him for his past wrongdoings but the princess condemns him instead to fight all his life for justice, never giving up. Crocodine and Hyunckel then leave to go on espionage to the headquarters of the demon army. Noticing that Leona is stronger than her in every aspect, Maam decides to temporarily separate from the group to train in martial arts. Popp would like to declare his love for her but decides to defer to her when it is worthy of her. In the demon fortress, Commander Baran accuses Hadlar (again resurrected by Mystvearn) of not wanting him to meet Dai as the latter is a "Dragon Knight" and decides to deal with him personally. Killvearn, The Dark King Vearn's trusted assassin and old acquaintance of Mystvearn, intervenes in their discussion and threatens to eliminate Hadlar if he fails again. Then, to counter the two traitorous commanders, Killvearn moves the headquarters. The fortress then takes the form of a giant and sets out to change headquarters.
09	Dragon Knight; Doragon no Kishi (竜の騎士)	February 10, 1992	978-4-08-871079-2
76. "Let's Go To The Department Store!" (デパートへ行こう!, Depāto e Ikō!); 77. "Super Dragon Army, Fierce Attack!!!" (超竜軍団猛攻!!!, Chōryū Gundan Mōkō!!!); 78. "Battle in Bengarna City" (ベンガーナ市街戦, Bengāna Shigaisen); 79. "Defeat the Hydra!!" (巨大竜を倒せ!!, Hidora o Taose!!); 80. "Roaring Dai...!!!" (吠えるダイ...!!!, Hoeru Dai...!!!); 81. "Dragon Knight" (竜の騎士, Doragon no Kishi); 82. "Crashing Baran!!!" (衝撃のバラン!!!, Shōgeki no Baran!!!); 83. "The Dragon Tamer's True Form" (竜騎将の正体, Ryūki Shō no Shōtai); 84. "The Laughing Dark King" (笑う大魔王, Warau Daimaō)
Dai, Popp, Leona and Gome go to Bengana to look for weapons and meet the seers Merle and her grandmother Nabara, from the land of Teran. However, the evil army attacks with dragons and a hydra. After a fierce fight, Dai and his friends are victorious but Dai, using his mysterious strength, scares the inhabitants. Merle and her grandmother, as well as Killvearn, recognize Dai's sign as the symbol of the Dragon Knight. In their country there is an underwater temple, which only Dragon Knights can access. The entire team goes there and Dai enters the temple alone, where a crystal ball explains to him that a Dragon Knight is a man-Dragon-Monster creature. The explanation is interrupted by the appearance of Baran, also a Dragon Knight, who orders him to join him and Vearn in destroying the humans, as a dragon knight must prevent one species from dominating the world at the expense of the others and that The Dark King wants to free the Earth from the humans who pollute it. Dai refuses but is defeated, after which Baran tells Popp and Leona that Dai is his son, from whom he has been separated for 11 years. In the presence of The Dark King, Killvearn confirms Dai's nature and jokes about Hadlar's cowardice, who, terrified of being removed from his position, then hopes that Dai will defeat Baran.
10	The Battle Between Father and Son!!! Chichi to Ko no Tatakai!!! (父と子の戦い!!!)	April 10, 1992	978-4-08-871080-8
85. "The Battle Between Father and Son!!!" (父と子の戦い!!!, Chichi to Ko no Tatakai!!!); 86. "Trembling With Fear! Dragonic Aura!!" (戦慄!竜闘気!!, Senritsu! Doragonikku Ōra!!); 87. "Risk Your Life...!!" (この生命かけて...!!, Kono Inochi Kakete...!!); 88. "Flash of Terror" (恐怖の閃光, Kyōfu no Senkō); 89. "Dai, Level 1...!!?" (ダイ・レベル1...!!?, Dai, Reberu Wan...!!?); 90. "The Gathering of the Strongest Army!!" (最強軍団集合!!, Saikyō Gundan Shūgō!!); 91. "The Encounter With The Dragon Rider!!!" (竜騎衆大接近!!!, Ryūki Shū Daisekkin!!!); 92. "Breakdown...!!?" (決裂...!!?, Ketsuretsu...!!?); 93. "Popp, Ready to Die For the Challenge!!" (ポップ、決死の挑戦!!, Poppu, Kesshi no Chōsen!!); 94. "Fury!! Galdandy" (狂乱!! ガルダンディー, Kyōran!! Garudandī)
Not even Dai's most powerful technique has any effect on Baran, who congratulates his son for knowing how to use their power, despite his young age. Using the true power of a Dragon Knight, Baran defeats Dai and faces Crocodine, who comes to their rescue, easily overpowering him and completely blinding him. Dai, saved and cared for by Leona, manages to hurt his father with the help of his friends. Baran then erases Dai's memory but is forced to retreat due to having become so consumed. Leona gains support from the King of Teran, who has Dai locked in an underground prison so enemies cannot find him. Meanwhile, Baran summons the three members of his team: Galdandy, Borahorn and Larhalt, and after explaining the situation to them they leave to recover Dai. In order to protect his friends, Popp therefore makes a strong resolution and separates from the group to intercept Baran's group alone. Taking them by surprise, the wizard manages to kill the enemy dragons but not stop Baran, who continues leaving his subordinates to deal with Popp. Furious at the loss of his dragon, Galdandy tortures Popp but is wounded by Hyunckel, who comes to his aid.
11	Dai, the Secret of Your Birth...!! Dai, Shussei no Himitsu...!! (ダイ、出生の秘密...!!)	July 3, 1992	978-4-08-871181-2
95. "Fierce Counterattack!! Avan's Disciples" (猛反撃!! アバンの使徒, Mōhangeki!! Aban no Shito); 96. "The Last Dragon Rider" (竜騎衆最後の男, Ryūki Shū Saigo no Otoko); 97. "Amudo VS Amudo!!" (鎧化対鎧化!!, Amudo Tsui Amudo!!); 98. "The Knife of Memories" (思い出のナイフ, Omoide no Naifu); 99. "Dai, the Secret of Your Birth...!!" (ダイ、出生の秘密...!!, Dai, Shussei no Himitsu...!!); 100. "From The Brink of Death" (起死回生, Kishikaisei); 101. "Mutual Sacrifice...!!" (強敵に捧ぐ...!!, Tomo ni Sasagu...!!); 102. "I'll Use My Body As A Shield!!" (我が身を盾に!!, Wagami o Tate ni!!); 103. "The Man Who Threw Away His Heart!!" (心を捨てた男!!, Kokoro o Suteta Otoko!!); 104. "The Ryuu-Majin Awakens!!!" (竜魔人目覚める!!!, Ryū Majin Mezameru!!!)
12	The World's Ultimate Offense and Defense!! Chijō Saidai no Kōbō!! (地上最大の攻防!!)	September 4, 1992	978-4-08-871182-9
105. "Our Dai...!!!" (おれたちのダイ...!!!, Oretachi no Dai...!!!); 106. "Popp's Final Moment" (ポップの最期, Poppu no Saigo); 107. "Cry!! Rage!!" (吠えろ!!怒れ!!!, Hoero!! Ikare!!!); 108. "The Hero Dai's Revival!!!" (勇者ダイ復活!!!, Yūsha Dai Fukkatsu!!!); 109. "The World's Ultimate Offense and Defense!!" (地上最大の攻防!!, Chijō Saidai no Kōbō!!); 110. "Super Spell, Life or Death...!!?" (超呪文・生か死か...!!?, Chōjumon, Sei ka Shi ka...!!?); 111. "The One Dragon Blade!!" (竜の一刀!!", Doragon no Ittō!!); 112. "An Attack That Surpasses Death!!!" (死を超えた一撃!!!, Shi o Koeta Ichigeki!!!); 113. "A Father's Farewell" (父との決別, Chichi to no Ketsubetsu)
13	Where's the Strongest Blade? Saikyō Ken wa Doko da...!!? (最強剣はどこだ...!!?)	November 4, 1992	978-4-08-871183-6
114. "The Final Notice" (最後通告, Saigo Tsūkoku); 115. "Maam's Back...!!?" (帰ってきたマァム...!!?, Kaette Kita Māmu...!!?); 116. "Fierce Battle!!! Ultimate Spell" (激突!!!極大呪文, Gekitotsu!!! Kyokudai Jumon); 117. "Individual Missions" (それぞれの使命, Sorezore no Shimei); 118. "Where's the Strongest Blade?" (最強剣はどこだ...!!?, Saikyō Ken wa Doko da...!!?); 119. "The Romos Martial Arts Tournament" (ロモス武術大会, Romosu Bujutsu Taikai); 120. "Reunited!! Fighter Maam" (再会!! 武闘家マァム, Saikai!! Butōka Māmu); 121. "The Blade of Champions" (覇者の剣, Hasha no Tsurugi); SP. "Avan, The Hero — Side Story" (【番外編】勇者アバン, (Bangaihen) Yūsha Aban)
14	The Fearsome Hyper Demon; Kyōfu no Chōma Seibutsu (恐怖の超魔生物)	December 26, 1992	978-4-08-871184-3
123. "Disaster in the Finals!!" (決勝戦の異変!!, Kesshōsen no Ihen!!); 124. "Zaboera's Son" (ザボエラの息子, Zaboera no Musuko); 125. "The Fearsome Hyper Demon" (恐怖の超魔生物, Kyōfu no Chōma Seibutsu); 126. "Dai is Devoured...!!!" (のみこまれたダイ...!!!, Nomikomareta Dai...!!!); 127. "Will It Happen!!? Dai's Rescue" (なるか!!? 勇者救出, Naru ka!!? Dai Kyūshutsu); 128. "Roar, Deadly Fist!!!" (うなれ必殺拳!!!, Unare Hissatsu Ken!!!); 129. "Flashing Counterattack!!!" (閃光の大逆襲!!!, Senkō no Daigyakushū!!!); 130. "The Cherished Item" (秘蔵のアイテム, Hizou no Aitemu); 131. "In This Moment, Everything...!!!" (一瞬にすべてを...!!!, Isshun ni Subete o...!!!); 132. "Zamza, Fade Into The Sun..." (ザムザ落日に消ゆ..., Zamuza Rakujitsu ni Kiyu...)
15	Kiganjou's Disembarkation!! Kiganjō Dai Jōriku!! (鬼岩城大上陸!!)	April 2, 1993	978-4-08-871185-0
133. "A New Adventure!!!" (新たなる出発!!!, Arata naru Tabidachi!!!); 134. "The Minion of Shadow Moves...!!" (影の参謀動く...!!, Kage no Sanbō Ugoku...!!); 135. "Holding the World Summit!!" (世界会議開催!!, Samitto Kaisai!!); 136. "Hometown Lankarks" (故郷ランカークス, Furusato Rankākusu); 137. "The Legendary Craftsman" (伝説の名工, Densetsu no Meikō); 138. "Kiganjou's Disembarkation!!" (鬼岩城大上陸!!, Kiganjō Dai Jōriku!!); 139. "Stop the Giant Demon Castle!!!" (巨大魔城をとめろ!!!, Kyodai Majō o Tomero!!!); 140. "The Giant of Despair" (絶望の巨人, Zetsubō no Kyojin); 141. "Shadow's Fury!!" (魔影軍団の猛威!!, Maei Gundan no Mōi!!)
16	Dai's Sword; Dai no Tsurugi (ダイの剣)	June 4, 1993	978-4-08-871186-7
142. "The Do or Die Line of Defense" (決死の防衛線, Kesshi no Bōeisen); 143. "Behold! The Avan Style Spear Technique" (見よ!! アバン流槍殺法, Miyo!! Aban Ryū Sōsappō); 144. "The Dark Teacher and Student Showdown!!!" (闇の師弟対決!!!, Yami no Shitei Taiketsu!!!); 145. "In The Gap Between Good and Evil...!!" (生と邪のはざまで...!!, Sei to Ja no Hazama de...!!); 146. "The Shadow Officer's Secret!!" (魔影参謀の秘密!!, Maei Sanbō no Himitsu!!); 147. "The Sword of Dai" (ダイの剣, Dai no Tsurugi); 148. "Hero Sighting!!!" (勇者見参!!!, Yūsha Kenzan!!!); 149. "Single Blade Dissection!!!" (一刀両断!!!, Ittō Ryōdan!!!); 150. "Dark Rage" (暗黒の怒り, Ankoku no Ikari); 151. "Pursuing Myst-Vearn" (追撃ミストバーン, Tsuigeki Misutobān)
17	The Revived Demon!!! Yomigaetta Majin!!! (よみがえった魔神!!!)	August 4, 1993	978-4-08-871187-4
152. "The Field of Death" (死の大地, Shi no Daichi); 153. "The Revived Demon!!!" (よみがえった魔神!!!, Yomigaetta Majin!!!); 154. "Nightmare of Hyper Demon Power" (悪夢の超魔パワー, Akumu no Chōma Pawā); 155. "The Demonic Right Arm...!!!" (魔性の右腕...!!!, Mashō no Migiude...!!!); 156. "Battle of the Strongest Swords!!!" (最強剣激突!!!, Saikyō Ken Gekitotsu!!!); 157. "The Brave Retreat" (勇気ある撤退, Yūki aru Tettai); 158. "Dai, Vanished Among The Glaciers" (氷河に消えた勇者（ダイ）, Hyōga ni Kieta Dai); 159. "Premonitions of the Final Battle" (最終決戦の予感, Saishū Kessen no Yokan); 160. "My Name is Vearn" (我が名はバーン, Waga Na wa Bān); 161. "Search the North Pole!" (極北をさがせ!!, Kyokuhoku o Sagase!!)
18	Bodyguards of Steel; Hagane no Shin'eitai (鋼の親衛隊)	October 4, 1993	978-4-08-871188-1
162. "Assault!! Ghost Division" (急襲!!妖魔士団, Kyūshū!! Yōma Shidan); 163. "Bodyguards of Steel" (鋼の親衛隊, Hagane no Shin'eitai); 164. "The Mobilization Begins!!" (行動開始!!, Kōdō Kaishi!!); 165. "Secret of the Strongest Spell" (極大呪文の秘密!!, Kyokudai Jumon no Himitsu!!); 166. "Seize!! The Strongest Power" (つかめ!!最強の力, Tsukame!! Saikyō no Chikara); 167. "To The Decisive Battle's Location...!!!" (決戦の地へ...!!!, Kessen no Chi e...!!!); 168. "The Dragon Rider Returns...!!" (竜騎将再び...!!, Ryūki Shō Futatabi...!!); 169. "Violent Earthquake in the Kingdom of Carl" (カール王国激震!!, Kāru Ōkoku Gekishin!!); 170. "The Hero of the North" (北の勇者, Kita no Yūsha); "The Adventure of Dai Fierce Battle Map Part II" (ダイ冒険激闘MAP PARTII, Dai Bōken Gekitō Mappu Pāto Ni); "The Legendary Supermetal!! The Secrets of Orihalcon!!!" (伝説の超金属!! オリハルコンの秘密!!!, Densetsu no Chōkinzoku!! Oriharukon no Himitsu!!!)
19	Clash!!! Party Battle; Gekitotsu!!! Pātī Batoru (激突!!!集団戦闘)	December 2, 1993	978-4-08-871189-8
171. "The Orihalcon Menace!!" (超金属の驚異!!, Oriharukon no Kyōi!!); 172. "Invincible!! The Shinei Kidan" (無敵!!親衛騎団, Muteki!! Shin'ei Kidan); 173. "Double-Edged Sword" (両刃の剣, Moroha no Tsurugi); 174. "Clash!!! Party Battle" (激突!!!集団戦闘, Gekitotsu!!! Pātī Batoru); 175. "The Rules of Chess" (チェスの原則, Chesu no Gensoku); 176. "Soul Blade!!!" (魂の剣!!!, Tamashii no Tsurugi!!!); 177. "Ultimate New Skill Explosion!!!" (超新技爆発!!!, Chōshingi Bakuhatsu!!!); 178. "Right and Wrong Teamwork" (正邪のチームワーク, Seija no Chīmuwāku); 179. "Invitation to the Decisive Battle!" (決戦場への誘い!, Kessenjō e no Izanai!)
20	The Desire of the Magic Spear; Chikai no Masō (誓いの魔槍)	February 4, 1994	978-4-08-871190-4
180. "The Assassin's Dagger!! Fenbren" (凶刃!!フェンブレン, Kyōjin!! Fenburen); 181. "The Perseverance of the Little Guy" (小さき者の意地!, Chiisaki Mono no Iji!); 182. "Unexpected Reinforcements" (意外なる救援, Igai naru Kyūen); 183. "Outbreak of the Great Battle of True Demons!!?" (真魔大戦勃発!!?, Shinma Taisen Boppatsu!!?); 184. "The Desire of the Magic Spear" (誓いの魔槍, Chikai no Masō); 185. "Fight...!!!" (勝負...!!!, Shōbu...!!!); 186. "Father and Son, Dragons to the Front Line!!!" (父子竜出陣!!!, Oyako Ryū Shutsujin!!!); 187. "Assault!! Vearn Palace" (突撃!! 大魔宮, Totsugeki!! Bān Paresu); 188. "The Ocean Floor Revenger!!" (海底の復讐者!!, Kaitei no Ribenjā!!); 189. "The Opening Door!!!" (開かれし扉!!!, Hirakareshi Tobira!!!)
21	Farewell, My Son... Saraba Waga Ko yo...!! (さらば我が子よ...!!)	April 4, 1994	978-4-08-871191-1
190. "Acknowledgement of War" (戦火の告白, Senka no Kokuhaku); 191. "Hadlar's Fearless Challenge!" (ハドラー不敵な挑戦!, Hadorā Futeki na Chōsen!); 192. "Determined To Take The Lead!!" (決意の先陣!!, Ketsui no Senjin!!); 193. "The Dark Lord, A Walking Bomb!!!" (爆弾を抱えた魔王!!!, Bakudan o Kakaeta Maō!!!); 194. "Attacking Is Impossible...!?" (攻撃不能...!?, Kōgeki Funō...!?); 195. "The Ultimate Clash of Dark and Light" (超激突の明暗, Chō Gekitotsu no Meian); 196. "Blood Trap" (血の罠, Chi no Wana); 197. "Farewell, My Son..." (さらば我が子よ...!!, Saraba Waga Ko yo...!!); 198. "Ryuu-Majin Counterattack!!!" (竜魔人逆襲!!!, Ryū Majin Gyakushū!!!)
22	Vearn Palace Appears!!! Bān Paresu Shutsugen!!! (大魔宮出現!!!)	June 3, 1994	978-4-08-871192-8
199. "Horrible Magic Power!!!" (戦慄の魔法力!!!, Senritsu no Mahōryoku!!!); 200. "Massive Explosion!!!" (大爆発!!!, Daibakuhatsu!!!); 201. "Vearn Palace Appears!!!" (大魔宮出現!!!, Bān Paresu Shutsugen!!!); 202. "The Phoenix in the Sky" (天かける不死鳥, Amakakeru Fushichō); 203. "The Death of Baran" (父・バランの死, Chichi, Baran no Shi); 204. "Surpassing Death...!!!" (屍を越えて...!!!, Shikabane o Koete...!!!); 205. "Vearn's Reward" (大魔王からの褒美, Bān kara no Hōbi); 206. "The Difference in Levels...!!!" (次元の違い...!!!, Jigen no Chigai...!!!); 207. "Battle of Despair!!!" (絶望のバトル!!!, Zetsubō no Batoru!!!); "The Secrets of Vearn Palace (大魔宮の秘密, Bān Paresu no Himitsu)
23	Prelude to World Annihilation!!! Sekai Hametsu e no Jokyoku!!! (世界破滅への序曲!!!)	August 4, 1994	978-4-08-871193-5
208. "The Sun In My Hand...!!" (太陽を我が手に...!!, Taiyō o Waga Te ni...!!); 209. "Dai, The Persistent Hero!!!" (不屈の勇者・ダイ!!!, Fukutsu no Yūsha, Dai!!!); 210. "Fearsome Trump Card!!" (恐怖の切り札!!, Kyōfu no Kirifuda!!); 211. "Broken Sword...!!!" (折れたる剣...!!!, Oretaru Tsurugi...!!!); 212. "Impossible!!? Unexpected Savior" (まさか!!? の救援者, Masaka!!? no Kyūensha); 213. "Unlikely Underdog" (思わぬ伏兵!!!, Omowanu Fukuhei!!!); 214. "Prelude to World Annihilation!!!" (世界破滅への序曲!!!, Sekai Hametsu e no Jokyoku!!!); 215. "Survivors...!!?" (生存者は...!!?, Seizonsha wa...!!?); 216. "The Queen of Carl" (カールの女王, Kāru no Joō)
24	The Fifth Symbol...!!! Itsutsume no Shirushi...!!! (五つめのしるし...!!!)	October 4, 1994	978-4-08-871194-2
217. "The Last Hope" (最後の希望, Saigo no Kibō); 218. "The Trap of the Execution Sentence!!!" (処刑宣告の罠!!!, Shokei Senkoku no Wana!!!); 219. "Dai, Withdraws From the Front Line...!!?" (ダイ戦線離脱...!!?, Dai Sensen Ridatsu...!!?); 220. "Get Up, Heroes!!!" (起てよ勇者!!!, Tate yo Yūsha!!!); 221. "The Fifth Symbol...!!!" (五つめのしるし...!!!, Itsutsume no Shirushi...!!!); 222. "Evil-Dispelling Cave" (破邪の洞窟, Haja no Dōkutsu); 223. "Challenge of 30 Hours!!!" (30時間の挑戦!!!, Sanjujikan no Chōsen!!!); 224. "Progress Towards a Hope!!!" (希望への前進!!!, Kibō e no Zenshin!!!); 225. "Holy Inheritance" (聖なる継承, Seinaru Keishō); 226. "Popp's Suffering" (ポップの苦悩, Poppu no Kunō)
25	Now!! Minakatoru; Iza!! Minakatōru (いざ!! 大破邪呪文)	December 2, 1994	978-4-08-871195-9
227. "Behold! The New Equipment" (見参! 最新装備, Kenzan! Saishin Sōbi); 228. "The Night Before the Battle" (決戦前夜の葛藤, Kessen Zen'ya no Kattō); 229. "Sleep, Hero" (勇者よ眠れ, Yūsha yo Nemure); 230. "The Evil Wine Glass...!!!" (邪悪の杯...!!!, Jaaku no Sakazuki...!!!); 231. "Rebirth of the Magic Sword Knight...!!?" (魔剣戦士復活...!!?, Maken Senshi Fukkatsu...!!?); 232. "The Battle of Light and Dark!!!" (光と闇の戦い!!!, Hikari to Yami no Batoru!!!); 233. "Gather!! The Five Disciples" (結集!! 5人の使徒, Kesshū!! Gonin no Shito); 234. "The Secret of Lon Berk" (ロン・ベルクの秘密, Ron Beruku no Himitsu); 235. "Now!! Minakatoru" (いざ!! 大破邪呪文, Iza!! Minakatōru); 236. "The Light of Five Colors" (五色の光, Goshiki no Hikari)
26	Tearful Attack; Namida no Tekijin Totsunyū!!! (涙の敵陣突入!!!)	March 3, 1995	978-4-08-871196-6
237. "The Makai Army Blockade!!!" (魔界軍団包囲網!!!, Makai Gundan Hōi Mō!!!); 238. "Minakatoru Crisis...!!!" (大破邪呪文の危機...!!!, Minakatōru no Kiki...!!!); 239. "Deadly Poisoned Fang" (殺意の毒牙, Satsui no Dokuga); 240. "Her Name Is ...!!" (その人の名は...!!, Sono Hito no Na wa...!!); 241. "Tearful Attack!!!" (涙の敵陣突入!!!, Namida no Tekijin Totsunyū!!!); 242. "Hadlar's Last Challenge" (バドラー最後の挑戦, Badorā Saigo no Chōsen); 243. "Queen!! The Secret Decision" (女王!! 秘めたる決意, Kuīn!! Himetaru Ketsui); 244. "Swing Your Fist, Maam!!!" (マァムよ拳をふるえ!!!, Māmu yo Kobushi o Furue!!!); 245. "Ultimate Clash of Love!!!" (愛の超激突!!!, Ai no Chō Gekitotsu!!!); 246. "A Comeback!! The Queen's Blind Spot" (逆転!! 女王の死角, Gyakuten!! Kuīn no Shikaku)
27	The Duel of True Dragons!!! Shinryū no Tatakai!!! (真竜の闘い!!!)	May 11, 1995	978-4-08-871197-3
247. "Let Go of Your Feelings...!!" (想いよ走れ...!!, Omoi yo Hashire...!!); 248. "Formidable Knight, Sigma!!" (脅威の騎士・シグマ!!, Kyōi no Naito, Shiguma!!); 249. "Victory or Destruction!!?" (勝利か!!? 消滅か!!?, Shōri ka!!? Shōmetsu ka!!?); 250. "Maam's Response" (マァムの返事, Māmu no Henji); 251. "The Duel of True Dragons!!!" (真竜の闘い!!!, Shinryū no Tatakai!!!); 252. "Here it Comes!! The Ultimate Special Attack" (出たぞ!! 超必殺技, Deta zo!! Chō Hissatsu Waza); 253. "Burning Life...!!!" (燃えつきる生命...!!!, Moe Tsukiru Inochi...!!!); 254. "The Final Blow!!!" (最後の一太刀!!!, Saigo no Hitotachi!!!); 255. "The End of the Battle...!?" (大死闘決着...!?, Dai Shitō Ketchaku...!?)
28	Resurrection!!! The Great Hero; Fukkatsu!!! Dai Yūsha (復活!!! 大勇者)	July 4, 1995	978-4-08-871198-0
256. "Reaper!! Kill Trap" (死神!! 殺しの罠, Shinigami!! Kiru Torappu); 257. "Hope within the Flame!!!" (炎の中の希望!!!, Honō no Naka no Kibō!!!); 258. "Will It Work Miraculous Escape!?" (なるか!? 奇蹟の脱出, Naru ka!? Kiseki no Dasshutsu); 259. "Popp, Death by Fire...!!!" (ポップ・炎に死す...!!!, Poppu, Honō ni Shisu...!!!); 260. "Resurrection!!! The Great Hero" (復活!!! 大勇者, Fukkatsu!!! Dai Yūsha); 261. "The Mystery of Avan's Return...!!!" (アバン復活の謎...!!!, Aban Fukkatsu no Nazo...!!!); 262. "Showdown with the Reaper!!" (死神との対決!!, Shinigami to no Taiketsu!!); 263. "Rebellious Hyunckel!!!" (反逆児ヒュンケル!!!, Hangyakuji Hyunkeru!!!); 264. "Revelations" (明かされた空白, Akasareta Kūhaku); 265. "Shine!!! The Secret of Anti-Evil" (輝け!!! 破邪の秘法, Kagayake!!! Haja no Hihō)
29	Arrival of the Super Weapon!!! Chōheiki Shōrai!!! (超兵器招来!!!)	September 4, 1995	978-4-08-871199-7
266. "Vearn Palace Trembles...!!!" (ゆれる大魔宮...!!!, Yureru Bān Paresu...!!!); 267. "Justice Marches On!!" (正義の快進撃!!, Seigi no Kaishingeki!!); 268. "The Confirmation...!!?" (究極の結論...!!?, Kyūkyoku no Ketsuron...!!?); 269. "Zaboera's Ultimate Transformation!!!" (ザボエル最強変身!!!, Zaboeru Saikyō Henshin!!!); 270. "The Other Hero" (もうひとりの勇者, Mō Hitori no Yūsha); 271. "Arrival of the Super Weapon!!!" (超兵器招来!!!, Chōheiki Shōrai!!!); 272. "Unfinished Ultimate Sword" (未完の究極剣, Mikan no Kyūkyoku Ken); 273. "Final Confrontation" (最後の対峙, Saigo no Taiji); 274. "Return from Hell" (地獄からの生還者, Jigoku kara no Seikansha); 275. "Silver-Haired Beast, Hym!!!" (銀髪鬼ヒム!!!, Ginpatsuki Himu!!!)
30	Farewell! To Warring Days; Saraba! Tatakai no Hibi yo (さらば! 闘いの日々よ)	November 2, 1995	978-4-08-871200-0
276. "Pawn's Promotion" (兵士の昇格, Bōn no Puromōshon); 277. "Clash!! Fists of Two Men" (激突!! 男の拳, Gekitotsu!! Otoko no Kobushi); 278. "In The End" (死闘の果てに!, Shitō no Hate ni!); 279. "Burning the Last Energy!!" (最後の闘志燃ゆ!!, Saigo no Tōshi Moyu!!); 280. "Checkmate!!!" (王手ッ!!!, Chekkumeito—!!!); 281. "The Arrival of a Super Warrior!!!" (超戦士推参!!!, Chō Senshi Suisan!!!); 282. "Farewell! To Warring Days" (さらば! 闘いの日々よ, Saraba! Tatakai no Hibi yo); 283. "Battle in White Garden!!" (白い宮庭の決闘, Howaito Gāden no Kettō!!); 284. "Erasure of Avan Complete" (アバン抹殺完了, Aban Massatsu Kanryō); 285. "The Successor of Justice!!" (正義の後継者, Seigi no Kōkeisha!!)
31	Number 2 Awakens!!! Dai 2 no Kakusei!!! (第2の覚醒!!!)	January 10, 1996	978-4-08-872201-6
286. "Resolution for Victory...!!!" (勝利への誓い...!!!, Shōri e no Chikai...!!!); 287. "Standing Firm!! Myst-Vearn" (不動!! ミストバーン, Fudō!! Misutobān); 288. "New Ties" (新たなる絆, Arata naru Kizuna); 289. "The Will of Father Baran" (父・バランの遺言, Chichi, Baran no Yuigon); 290. "Unexpected Challenge...!?" (予期せぬ難関...!?, Yokisenu Nankan...!?); 291. "The Heart of the Palace" (魔宮の心臓, Makyū no Shinzō); 292. "Rise! Fated Knight" (起て! 宿命の騎士, Tate! Shukumei no Kishi); 293. "Number 2 Awakens!!!" (第2の覚醒!!!, Dai 2 no Kakusei!!!); 294. "Roar!!! Double Dragon Crest" (吠えろ!!! 双竜紋, Hoero!!! Sōryūmon); 295. "Summit of Vearn Palace!!!" (大魔宮の頂上!!!, Bān Paresu no Chōjō!!!)
32	The Final Battle of Myst; Misuto Saishū Kessen (ミスト最終決戦)	March 4, 1996	978-4-08-872202-3
296. "Terrifying Hesitation...!" (恐怖と迷い...!, Kyōfu to Mayoi...!); 297. "Genetic Battle Memory!!" (闘いの遺伝子!!, Tatakai no Idenshi!!); 298. "Victory for Whom" (誰がための勝利, Tagatame no Shōri); 299. "Blood-Stained Conclusion...!!!" (血塗られた決着...!!!, Chinurareta Ketchaku...!!!); 300. "A Worrisome Advantage" (不安な優勢, Fuan na Yūsei); 301. "The Final Battle of Myst" (ミスト最終決戦, Misuto Saishū Kessen); 302. "Silver's Fury!!" (白銀の猛威!!, Hakugin no Mōi!!); 303. "Dark Veil" (闇の衣, Yami no Koromo); 304. "Gamble for Victory!!!" (勝負を賭けた攻撃!!!, Shōbu o Kaketa Kōgeki!!!); 305. "Be Gone, Dark King...!!" (大魔王消ゆ...!!, Daimaō Kiyu...!!)
33	Myst and Kill; Misuto to Kiru (影と死神)	July 4, 1996	978-4-08-872203-0
306. "I am the Strongest!!!" (私が最強だ!!!, Watashi ga Saikyō da!!!); 307. "Secret of Immortality!!!" (不死身の秘密!!!, Fujimi no Himitsu!!!); 308. "Frozen Time...!" (凍れる時間...!, Kōreru Toki...!); 309. "Great Forerunners" (大いなる先駆者たち, Ōinaru Senkushatachi); 310. "Direct Hit!! Frizz Cracker" (直撃!! 極大消滅呪文, Chokugeki!! Medorōa); 311. "Terrifying Truth...!!!" (戦慄の事実...!!!, Senritsu no Jijitsu...!!!); 312. "Myst and Kill" (影と死神, Misuto to Kiru); 313. "The Battle that Surpasses Death" (死を越えた決着戦, Shi o Koeta Ketchakusen); 314. "Passing Judgement...!" (裁きは下った...!, Jajji wa Kudatta...!)
34	Advent of the True Demon Lord!!! Shin Daimaō Kōrin!!! (真・大魔王降臨!!!)	October 3, 1996	978-4-08-872204-7
315. "Vearn's Greatest Mystery" (バーン最大の謎, Bān Saidai no Nazo); 316. "Advent of the True Dark King!!!" (真・大魔王降臨!!!, Shin Daimaō Kōrin!!!); 317. "Dark Maam!" (黒いマァム!, Kuroi Māmu!); 318. "The Fated Demise" (宿命の終焉, Shukumei no Shūen); 319. "Support the Hero!" (勇者の下へ!, Yūsha no Moto e!); 320. "Facade Fighting!!!" (正面激突!!!, Shōmen Gekitotsu!!!); 321. "The Motionless Stance" (不動の構え, Fudō no Kamae); 322. "Invitation to the Underworld" (魔界への誘い, Makai e no Izanai); 323. "Eyes That Won't Shut!!" (閉じない瞳!!, Tojinai Hitomi!!)
35	Strike with Your Life!!! Inochi de Butsukare!!! (生命でぶつかれ!!!)	February 2, 1997	978-4-08-872205-4
324. "Seize Victory!!!" (勝機をつかめ!!!, Shōki o Tsukame!!!); 325. "The Tenchimatou's Blind Spot...!!?" (天地魔闘の死角...!!?, Tenchi Matō no Shikaku...!!?); 326. "Strike with Your Life!!!" (生命でぶつかれ!!!, Inochi de Butsukare!!!); 327. "Last Attack!!!" (ラストアタック!!!, Rasuto Atakku!!!); 328. "Strengthened by Bonds...!" (絆にかけて...!, Kizuna ni Kakete...!); 329. "With All Your Might!!!" (渾身!!!, Konshin!!!); 330. "One Moment!!!" (一瞬!!!, Isshun!!!); 331. "The Last Great Twist" (最大最後の逆転, Saidai Saigo no Gyakuten); 332. "Annihilation of the Surface" (地上消滅, Chijō Shōmetsu)
36	Flash of Light; Senkō no Yō ni (閃光のように)	April 4, 1997	978-4-08-872206-1
333. "The Voice that Echoes in the Darkness" (響く闇からの声, Hibiku Yami kara no Koe); 334. "Stand Up...!!!" (起って...!!!, Tatte...!!!); 335. "Flash of Light" (閃光のように, Senkō no Yō ni); 336. "Miracle Inside the Hitomi" (瞳の中の奇蹟, Hitomi no Naka no Kiseki); 337. "The Tear of God" (神の涙, Kami no Namida); 338. "The Last Wish" (最後の願い, Saigo no Negai); 339. "One Hearts As One...!!" (心をひとつに...!!, Kokoro o Hitotsu ni...!!); 340. "When the World Shines" (世界が輝く時, Sekai ga Kagayaku Toki); 341. "Dai's Decision" (ダイの決断, Dai no Ketsudan)
37	Farewell!!! Beloved Surface; Saraba!!! Ai suru Chijō yo (さらば!!!愛する地上よ)	June 4, 1997	978-4-08-872207-8
342. "Boiling Dragon Blood!!!" (たぎる竜の血!!!, Tagiru Doragon no Chi!!!); 343. "Roar!!!" (咆哮!!!, Hōkō!!!); 344. "Escape from Vearn Palace" (大魔宮 脱出せよ, Bān Paresu Dasshutsu se yo); 345. "Death Battle Above the Clouds" (死闘・天空へ, Shitō, Tenkū e); 346. "With This, Victory Will Be Mine" (この腕で勝利を, Kono Ude de Shōri o); 347. "Farewell! My Friends" (さらば! 我が友, Saraba! Waga Tomo); 348. "Farewell!! Dark King" (さらば!! 大魔王, Saraba!! Daimaō); 349. "Farewell!!! Beloved Surface" (さらば!!! 愛する地上よ, Saraba!!! Ai suru Chijō yo)

=== Bunkoban release ===
No.	Title	Release date	ISBN
01	Birth Arc; Tanjō no Shō (誕生の章)	June 18, 2003	4-08-618063-4
01. "Gush! Gulp! (Part 1)" (デルバ!イルイル!(前編), Derupa! Iruiru! (Zenpen)); 02. "Gush! Gulp! (Part 2)" (デルバ!イルイル!(後編), Derupa! Iruiru! (Kōhen)); 03. "Dai o' Might!!! (Part 1)" (ダイ爆発!!!(前編), Dai Bakuhatsu!!! (Zenpen)); 04. "Dai o' Might!!! (Part 2)" (ダイ爆発!!!(中編), Dai Bakuhatsu!!! (Chūhen)); 05. "Dai o' Might!!! (Part 3)" (ダイ爆発!!!(後編), Dai Bakuhatsu!!! (Kōhen)); 06. "The Hero's Tutor!!" (勇者の家庭教師!!, Yūsha no Kateikyōshi!!); 07. "Dai's Special Training!!!" (ダイ特訓!!!, Dai Tokkun!!!); 08. "The Dragon Who Wore Glasses!" (メガネをかけた竜!, Megane o Kaketa Ryū!); 09. "The Dark Lord Reappears...!?" (魔王の出現...!?, Maō no Shutsugen...!?); 10. "Hadlar's Identity...!!" (ハドラーの正体...!!, Hadorā no Shōtai...!!); 11. "Battle!! Hadlar versus Avan" (対決!!ハドラー対アバン, Taiketsu!! Hadorā Tai Aban); 12. "The Insignia of Avan" (アバンのしるし, Aban no Shirushi); 13. "Dai's Rage!!!" (ダイ激怒!!!, Dai Gekido!!!); 14. "Explosion!! Strash" (爆発!! 最強技, Bakuhatsu!! Sutorasshu); 15. "The Journey to Epic Adventure!!" (大冒険への旅立ち!!, Daibōken e no Tabidachi!!)
02	Gathering Arc I Shūketsu no Shō I (集結の章 I)	June 18, 2003	4-08-618064-2
16. "Maam of the Magic Forest" (魔の森のマァム, Ma no Mori no Māmu); 17. "The Beast King!! Crocodine" (獣王!!クロコダイン, Jū Ō!! Kurokodain); 18. "The Beast King's War Cry" (獣王のおたけび!!, Jū Ō no Otakebi!!); 19. "Gather!! The Disciples of Avan" (集え!!アバンの使徒, Tsudoe!! Aban no Shito); 20. "The Miracle Magic Bullet Gun" (驚異の魔弾銃, Kyōi no Madangan); 21. "Avan, Our Teacher" (アバン・我らが師, Aban Warera ga Shi); 22. "3rd Companion!!" (第3の仲間!!, Daisan no Nakama!!); 23. "Romos, Crisis Draws Near" (危機迫るロモス, Kiki Semaru Romosu); 24. "Attack of the Hundred Beast Army" (百獣総進撃!!, Hyakujū Sōshingeki!!); 25. "Dai's Weak Point...!?" (ダイの弱点...!?, Dai no Jakuten...!?); 26. "Foul Play! The Ghost Bishop" (卑劣なり! 妖魔司教, Hiretsu nari! Yōma Shikyō); 27. "A Fragment of Courage!" (ひとかけらの勇気!, Hito Kakera no Yūki!); 28. "Popp! Risk your Life!!" (ポップ!生命をかけろ!!, Poppu! Inochi o Kakero!!); 29. "The Miracle of Friendship" (奇跡呼ぶ友情, Kiseki Yobu Yūjō); 30. "Dai, Crest of Anger!!" (ダイ怒りの紋章!!, Dai Ikari no Monshō!!); 31. "Small Heroes" (小さな勇者たち, Chiisana Yūshatachi)
03	Gathering Arc II; Shūketsu no Shō II (集結の章 II)	June 18, 2003	4-08-618065-0
32. "Aim for Papnica!" (パプニカをめざせ!, Papunika o Mezase!); 33. "The Gathering of the 6 Commanders...!?" (6大団長集結...!?, Roku Daidanchō Shūketsu...!?); 34. "The Mysterious Swordmaster" (謎の剛剣士, Nazo no Gōkenshi); 35. "The Mystic Swordsman, Hyunckel!!" (魔剣戦士ヒュンケル!!, Maken Senshi Hyunkeru!!); 36. "His Father's Enemy...Avan!?" (父の敵...アバン!?, Chichi no Kataki... Aban!?); 37. "The Strongest Black Sword!!" (黒き最強剣!!, Kuroki Saikyō Ken!!); 38. "The Absolute End...!!" (絶体絶命...!!, Zettai Zetsumei...!!); 39. "The Beast King's Tears" (獣王の涙, Jū Ō no Namida); 40. "This Is The Underground Demon Castle!" (これが地底魔城だ!, Kore ga Chitei Majō da!); 41. "Bet It On A Lightning Strike!" (稲妻にかけろ!, Inazuma ni Kakero!); 42. "Sneaking In! The Dungeon of Death" (潜入!死の迷宮, Sennyū! Shi no Danjon); 43. "The Decisive Moment...!!" (決着の瞬間...!!, Ketchaku no Toki...!!); 44. "Dai, To Die By The Demonic Sword...!!?" (ダイ、魔剣に死す...!!?, Dai, Maken ni Shisu...!!?); 45. "Father's Soul!!" (父の魂!!, Chichi no Tamashii!!); 46. "The Lightning Sword of Justice!!!" (正義の稲妻剣!!!, Seigi no Inazuma Ken!!!); 47. "Farewell, Lonely Soldier" (さらば孤独の戦士, Saraba Kodoku no Senshi)
04	Clash Arc I Gekitō no Shō I (激闘の章 I)	August 8, 2003	4-08-618066-9
48. "The Flare Signal" (合図の信号弾, Aizu no Shingōdan); 49. "Where's Leona......!?" (その時、レオナは......!?, Sono toki, Reona wa......!?); 50. "Cruelty! Flazzard" (残酷!フレイザード, Zankoku! Fureizādo); 51. "The Hero VS The Fire and Ice General!!" (勇者対氷炎将軍!!, Yūsha Tai Hyōen Shōgun!!); 52. "Terrifying Magic Barrier!!" (恐怖の結界呪法!!, Kyōfu no Kekkai Juhō!!); 53. "Frozen Beauty, Leona!" (凍れる美女・レオナ!, Kōreru Bijo Reona!); 54. "The Rumored Great Magician" (噂の大魔道士, Uwasa no Dai Madōshi); 55. "Matoriv's Special Training" (マトリフの特訓, Matorifu no Tokkun); 56. "Set Off For Valge Island" (バルジ島へ上陸せよ, Baruji-tō e Jōriku se yo); 57. "The Dark Army Wages a Full-Scale Attack!!!" (魔王軍総攻撃!!!, Maōgun Sōkōgeki!!!); 58. "A Heated Struggle to the Death!!" (超高熱の死闘!!, Chōkōnetsu no Shitō!!); 59. "Immortal Saviour!!!" (不死身の救世主!!!, Fujimi no Kyūseishu!!!); 60. "Warrior Revived!!" (戦士復活!!, Senshi Fukkatsu!!); 61. "Clash!! Hyunckel VS Hadlar" (激突!!ヒュンケル対ハドラー, Gekitotsu!! Hyunkeru Tai Hadorā)
05	Clash Arc II; Gekitō no Shō II (激闘の章 II)	August 8, 2003	4-08-618067-7
62. "Roaring Flames, Final Touki!!" (火を吹く最終闘気!!, Hi o Fuku Saishū Tōki!!); 63. "The Cross of Life and Death" (生と死の十字架, Sei to Shi no Kurusu); 64. "Infiltration!! Save Leona" (突入!!レオナを救え, Totsunyū!! Reona o Sukue); 65. "Flazzard's Tenacity" (フレイザードの執念, Fureizādo no Shūnen); 66. "Hailstorm of Stones!!!" (嵐の弾岩!!!, Arashi no Dangan!!!); 67. "The Final Secret of Avan Style" (アバン流最後の奥義, Aban Ryū Saigo no Ōgi); 68. "The Sky Slash Appears!!" (出たっ!! 空裂斬, Deta—!! Kūretsuzan); 69. "Giant Flame Man!!!" (魔炎気の巨人!!!, Maenki no Kyojin!!!); 70. "Now... Slice Everything...!!!" (いま...すべてを斬る...!!!, Ima... Subete o Kiru...!!!); 71. "Goodbye, Magic Bullet Gun" (さよなら魔弾銃, Sayonara Madangan); 72. "Victory! And Now..." (勝利!そして..., Shōri! Soshite...); 73. "Maam's Decision" (マァムの決意, Māmu no Ketsui); 74. "Shaking Kiganjou...!!" (揺れる鬼岩城...!!, Yureru Kiganjō...!!); 75. "Until The Day We Meet Again" (また会う日まで, Mata Au Hi Made)
06	Destiny Arc I Shukumei no Shō I (宿命の章 I)	September 18, 2003	4-08-618068-5
76. "Let's Go To The Department Store!" (デパートへ行こう!, Depāto e Ikō!); 77. "Super Dragon Army, Fierce Attack!!!" (超竜軍団猛攻!!!, Chōryū Gundan Mōkō!!!); 78. "Battle in Bengarna City" (ベンガーナ市街戦, Bengāna Shigaisen); 79. "Defeat the Hydra!!" (巨大竜を倒せ!!, Hidora o Taose!!); 80. "Roaring Dai...!!!" (吠えるダイ...!!!, Hoeru Dai...!!!); 81. "Dragon Knight" (竜の騎士, Doragon no Kishi); 82. "Crashing Baran!!!" (衝撃のバラン!!!, Shōgeki no Baran!!!); 83. "The Dragon Tamer's True Form" (竜騎将の正体, Ryūki Shō no Shōtai); 84. "The Laughing Dark King" (笑う大魔王, Warau Daimaō); 85. "The Battle Between Father and Son!!!" (父と子の戦い!!!, Chichi to Ko no Tatakai!!!); 86. "Trembling With Fear! Dragonic Aura!!" (戦慄!竜闘気!!, Senritsu! Doragonikku Ōra!!); 87. "Risk Your Life...!!" (この生命かけて...!!, Kono Inochi Kakete...!!); 88. "Flash of Terror" (恐怖の閃光, Kyōfu no Senkō); 89. "Dai, Level 1...!!?" (ダイ・レベル1...!!?, Dai, Reberu Wan...!!?)
07	Destiny Arc II; Shukumei no Shō II (宿命の章 II)	September 18, 2003	4-08-618069-3
90. "The Gathering of the Strongest Army!!" (最強軍団集合!!, Saikyō Gundan Shūgō!!); 91. "The Encounter With The Dragon Rider!!!" (竜騎衆大接近!!!, Ryūki Shū Daisekkin!!!); 92. "Breakdown...!!?" (決裂...!!?, Ketsuretsu...!!?); 93. "Popp, Ready to Die For the Challenge!!" (ポップ、決死の挑戦!!, Poppu, Kesshi no Chōsen!!); 94. "Fury!! Galdandy" (狂乱!! ガルダンディー, Kyōran!! Garudandī); 95. "Fierce Counterattack!! Avan's Disciples" (猛反撃!! アバンの使徒, Mōhangeki!! Aban no Shito); 96. "The Last Dragon Rider" (竜騎衆最後の男, Ryūki Shū Saigo no Otoko); 97. "Amudo VS Amudo!!" (鎧化対鎧化!!, Amudo Tsui Amudo!!); 98. "The Knife of Memories" (思い出のナイフ, Omoide no Naifu); 99. "Dai, the Secret of Your Birth...!!" (ダイ、出生の秘密...!!, Dai, Shussei no Himitsu...!!); 100. "From The Brink of Death" (起死回生, Kishikaisei); 101. "Mutual Sacrifice...!!" (強敵に捧ぐ...!!, Tomo ni Sasagu...!!); 102. "I'll Use My Body As A Shield!!" (我が身を盾に!!, Wagami o Tate ni!!); 103. "The Man Who Threw Away His Heart!!" (心を捨てた男!!, Kokoro o Suteta Otoko!!); 104. "The Ryuu-Majin Awakens!!!" (竜魔人目覚める!!!, Ryū Majin Mezameru!!!)
08	Destiny Arc III; Shukumei no Shō III (宿命の章 III)	September 18, 2003	4-08-618070-7
105. "Our Dai...!!!" (おれたちのダイ...!!!, Oretachi no Dai...!!!); 106. "Popp's Final Moment" (ポップの最期, Poppu no Saigo); 107. "Cry!! Rage!!" (吠えろ!!怒れ!!!, Hoero!! Ikare!!!); 108. "The Hero Dai's Revival!!!" (勇者ダイ復活!!!, Yūsha Dai Fukkatsu!!!); 109. "The World's Ultimate Offense and Defense!!" (地上最大の攻防!!, Chijō Saidai no Kōbō!!); 110. "Super Spell, Life or Death...!!?" (超呪文・生か死か...!!?, Chōjumon, Sei ka Shi ka...!!?); 111. "The One Dragon Blade!!" (竜の一刀!!", Doragon no Ittō!!); 112. "An Attack That Surpasses Death!!!" (死を超えた一撃!!!, Shi o Koeta Ichigeki!!!); 113. "A Father's Farewell" (父との決別, Chichi to no Ketsubetsu); 114. "The Final Notice" (最後通告, Saigo Tsūkoku); 115. "Maam's Back...!!?" (帰ってきたマァム...!!?, Kaette Kita Māmu...!!?); 116. "Fierce Battle!!! Ultimate Spell" (激突!!!極大呪文, Gekitotsu!!! Kyokudai Jumon); 117. "Individual Missions" (それぞれの使命, Sorezore no Shimei); SP. "Avan, The Hero — Side Story" (【番外編】勇者アバン, (Bangaihen) Yūsha Aban)
09	Holy Sword Arc I Seiken no Shō I (聖剣の章 I)	October 17, 2003	4-08-618071-5
119. "Where's the Strongest Blade?" (最強剣はどこだ...!!?, Saikyō Ken wa Doko da...!!?); 120. "The Romos Martial Arts Tournament" (ロモス武術大会, Romosu Bujutsu Taikai); 121. "Reunited!! Fighter Maam" (再会!! 武闘家マァム, Saikai!! Butōka Māmu); 122. "The Blade of Champions" (覇者の剣, Hasha no Tsurugi); 123. "Disaster in the Finals!!" (決勝戦の異変!!, Kesshōsen no Ihen!!); 124. "Zaboera's Son" (ザボエラの息子, Zaboera no Musuko); 125. "The Fearsome Hyper Demon" (恐怖の超魔生物, Kyōfu no Chōma Seibutsu); 126. "Dai is Devoured...!!!" (のみこまれたダイ...!!!, Nomikomareta Dai...!!!); 127. "Will It Happen!!? Dai's Rescue" (なるか!!? 勇者救出, Naru ka!!? Dai Kyūshutsu); 128. "Roar, Deadly Fist!!!" (うなれ必殺拳!!!, Unare Hissatsu Ken!!!); 129. "Flashing Counterattack!!!" (閃光の大逆襲!!!, Senkō no Daigyakushū!!!); 130. "The Cherished Item" (秘蔵のアイテム, Hizou no Aitemu); 131. "In This Moment, Everything...!!!" (一瞬にすべてを...!!!, Isshun ni Subete o...!!!); 132. "Zamza, Fade Into The Sun..." (ザムザ落日に消ゆ..., Zamuza Rakujitsu ni Kiyu...); 133. "A New Adventure!!!" (新たなる出発!!!, Arata naru Tabidachi!!!); 134. "The Minion of Shadow Moves...!!" (影の参謀動く...!!, Kage no Sanbō Ugoku...!!)
10	Holy Sword Arc II; Seiken no Shō II (聖剣の章 II)	October 17, 2003	4-08-618072-3
135. "Holding the World Summit!!" (世界会議開催!!, Samitto Kaisai!!); 136. "Hometown Lankarks" (故郷ランカークス, Furusato Rankākusu); 137. "The Legendary Craftsman" (伝説の名工, Densetsu no Meikō); 138. "Kiganjou's Disembarkation!!" (鬼岩城大上陸!!, Kiganjō Dai Jōriku!!); 139. "Stop the Giant Demon Castle!!!" (巨大魔城をとめろ!!!, Kyodai Majō o Tomero!!!); 140. "The Giant of Despair" (絶望の巨人, Zetsubō no Kyojin); 141. "Shadow's Fury!!" (魔影軍団の猛威!!, Maei Gundan no Mōi!!); 142. "The Do or Die Line of Defense" (決死の防衛線, Kesshi no Bōeisen); 143. "Behold! The Avan Style Spear Technique" (見よ!! アバン流槍殺法, Miyo!! Aban Ryū Sōsappō); 144. "The Dark Teacher and Student Showdown!!!" (闇の師弟対決!!!, Yami no Shitei Taiketsu!!!); 145. "In The Gap Between Good and Evil...!!" (生と邪のはざまで...!!, Sei to Ja no Hazama de...!!); 146. "The Shadow Officer's Secret!!" (魔影参謀の秘密!!, Maei Sanbō no Himitsu!!); 147. "The Sword of Dai" (ダイの剣, Dai no Tsurugi); 148. "Hero Sighting!!!" (勇者見参!!!, Yūsha Kenzan!!!); 149. "Single Blade Dissection!!!" (一刀両断!!!, Ittō Ryōdan!!!); 150. "Dark Rage" (暗黒の怒り, Ankoku no Ikari); 151. "Pursuing Myst-Vearn" (追撃ミストバーン, Tsuigeki Misutobān)
11	Epic Challenge Arc I Chōsen no Shō I (挑戦の章 I)	November 18, 2003	4-08-618073-1
152. "The Field of Death" (死の大地, Shi no Daichi); 153. "The Revived Demon!!!" (よみがえった魔神!!!, Yomigaetta Majin!!!); 154. "Nightmare of Hyper Demon Power" (悪夢の超魔パワー, Akumu no Chōma Pawā); 155. "The Demonic Right Arm...!!!" (魔性の右腕...!!!, Mashō no Migiude...!!!); 156. "Battle of the Strongest Swords!!!" (最強剣激突!!!, Saikyō Ken Gekitotsu!!!); 157. "The Brave Retreat" (勇気ある撤退, Yūki aru Tettai); 158. "Dai, Vanished Among The Glaciers" (氷河に消えた勇者（ダイ）, Hyōga ni Kieta Dai); 159. "Premonitions of the Final Battle" (最終決戦の予感, Saishū Kessen no Yokan); 160. "My Name is Vearn" (我が名はバーン, Waga Na wa Bān); 161. "Search the North Pole!" (極北をさがせ!!, Kyokuhoku o Sagase!!); 162. "Assault!! Ghost Division" (急襲!!妖魔士団, Kyūshū!! Yōma Shidan); 163. "Bodyguards of Steel" (鋼の親衛隊, Hagane no Shin'eitai); 164. "The Mobilization Begins!!" (行動開始!!, Kōdō Kaishi!!); 165. "Secret of the Strongest Spell" (極大呪文の秘密!!, Kyokudai Jumon no Himitsu!!); 166. "Seize!! The Strongest Power" (つかめ!!最強の力, Tsukame!! Saikyō no Chikara); 167. "To The Decisive Battle's Location...!!!" (決戦の地へ...!!!, Kessen no Chi e...!!!); 168. "The Dragon Rider Returns...!!" (竜騎将再び...!!, Ryūki Shō Futatabi...!!)
12	Epic Challenge Arc II; Chōsen no Shō II (挑戦の章 II)	November 18, 2003	4-08-618074-X
169. "Violent Earthquake in the Kingdom of Carl" (カール王国激震!!, Kāru Ōkoku Gekishin!!); 170. "The Hero of the North" (北の勇者, Kita no Yūsha); 171. "The Orihalcon Menace!!" (超金属の驚異!!, Oriharukon no Kyōi!!); 172. "Invincible!! The Shinei Kidan" (無敵!!親衛騎団, Muteki!! Shin'ei Kidan); 173. "Double-Edged Sword" (両刃の剣, Moroha no Tsurugi); 174. "Clash!!! Party Battle" (激突!!!集団戦闘, Gekitotsu!!! Pātī Batoru); 175. "The Rules of Chess" (チェスの原則, Chesu no Gensoku); 176. "Soul Blade!!!" (魂の剣!!!, Tamashii no Tsurugi!!!); 177. "Ultimate New Skill Explosion!!!" (超新技爆発!!!, Chōshingi Bakuhatsu!!!); 178. "Right and Wrong Teamwork" (正邪のチームワーク, Seija no Chīmuwāku); 179. "Invitation to the Decisive Battle!" (決戦場への誘い!, Kessenjō e no Izanai!); 180. "The Assassin's Dagger!! Fenbren" (凶刃!!フェンブレン, Kyōjin!! Fenburen); 181. "The Perseverance of the Little Guy" (小さき者の意地!, Chiisaki Mono no Iji!); 182. "Unexpected Reinforcements" (意外なる救援, Igai naru Kyūen); 183. "Outbreak of the Great Battle of True Demons!!?" (真魔大戦勃発!!?, Shinma Taisen Boppatsu!!?); 184. "The Desire of the Magic Spear" (誓いの魔槍, Chikai no Masō)
13	Epic Challenge Arc III; Chōsen no Shō III (挑戦の章 III)	November 18, 2003	4-08-618075-8
185. "Fight...!!!" (勝負...!!!, Shōbu...!!!); 186. "Father and Son, Dragons to the Front Line!!!" (父子竜出陣!!!, Oyako Ryū Shutsujin!!!); 187. "Assault!! Vearn Palace" (突撃!! 大魔宮, Totsugeki!! Bān Paresu); 188. "The Ocean Floor Revenger!!" (海底の復讐者!!, Kaitei no Ribenjā!!); 189. "The Opening Door!!!" (開かれし扉!!!, Hirakareshi Tobira!!!); 190. "Acknowledgement of War" (戦火の告白, Senka no Kokuhaku); 191. "Hadlar's Fearless Challenge!" (ハドラー不敵な挑戦!, Hadorā Futeki na Chōsen!); 192. "Determined To Take The Lead!!" (決意の先陣!!, Ketsui no Senjin!!); 193. "The Dark Lord, A Walking Bomb!!!" (爆弾を抱えた魔王!!!, Bakudan o Kakaeta Maō!!!); 194. "Attacking Is Impossible...!?" (攻撃不能...!?, Kōgeki Funō...!?); 195. "The Ultimate Clash of Dark and Light" (超激突の明暗, Chō Gekitotsu no Meian); 196. "Blood Trap" (血の罠, Chi no Wana); 197. "Farewell, My Son..." (さらば我が子よ...!!, Saraba Waga Ko yo...!!); 198. "Ryuu-Majin Counterattack!!!" (竜魔人逆襲!!!, Ryū Majin Gyakushū!!!); 199. "Horrible Magic Power!!!" (戦慄の魔法力!!!, Senritsu no Mahōryoku!!!); 200. "Massive Explosion!!!" (大爆発!!!, Daibakuhatsu!!!)
14	Holy Ordeal Arc I Shiren no Shō I (試練の章 I)	December 12, 2003	4-08-618076-6
201. "Vearn Palace Appears!!!" (大魔宮出現!!!, Bān Paresu Shutsugen!!!); 202. "The Phoenix in the Sky" (天かける不死鳥, Amakakeru Fushichō); 203. "The Death of Baran" (父・バランの死, Chichi, Baran no Shi); 204. "Surpassing Death...!!!" (屍を越えて...!!!, Shikabane o Koete...!!!); 205. "Vearn's Reward" (大魔王からの褒美, Bān kara no Hōbi); 206. "The Difference in Levels...!!!" (次元の違い...!!!, Jigen no Chigai...!!!); 207. "Battle of Despair!!!" (絶望のバトル!!!, Zetsubō no Batoru!!!); 208. "The Sun In My Hand...!!" (太陽を我が手に...!!, Taiyō o Waga Te ni...!!); 209. "Dai, The Persistent Hero!!!" (不屈の勇者・ダイ!!!, Fukutsu no Yūsha, Dai!!!); 210. "Fearsome Trump Card!!" (恐怖の切り札!!, Kyōfu no Kirifuda!!); 211. "Broken Sword...!!!" (折れたる剣...!!!, Oretaru Tsurugi...!!!); 212. "Impossible!!? Unexpected Savior" (まさか!!? の救援者, Masaka!!? no Kyūensha); 213. "Unlikely Underdog" (思わぬ伏兵!!!, Omowanu Fukuhei!!!); 214. "Prelude to World Annihilation!!!" (世界破滅への序曲!!!, Sekai Hametsu e no Jokyoku!!!); 215. "Survivors...!!?" (生存者は...!!?, Seizonsha wa...!!?); 216. "The Queen of Carl" (カールの女王, Kāru no Joō)
15	Holy Ordeal Arc II; Shiren no Shō II (試練の章 II)	December 12, 2003	4-08-618077-4
217. "The Last Hope" (最後の希望, Saigo no Kibō); 218. "The Trap of the Execution Sentence!!!" (処刑宣告の罠!!!, Shokei Senkoku no Wana!!!); 219. "Dai, Withdraws From the Front Line...!!?" (ダイ戦線離脱...!!?, Dai Sensen Ridatsu...!!?); 220. "Get Up, Heroes!!!" (起てよ勇者!!!, Tate yo Yūsha!!!); 221. "The Fifth Symbol...!!!" (五つめのしるし...!!!, Itsutsume no Shirushi...!!!); 222. "Evil-Dispelling Cave" (破邪の洞窟, Haja no Dōkutsu); 223. "Challenge of 30 Hours!!!" (30時間の挑戦!!!, Sanjujikan no Chōsen!!!); 224. "Progress Towards a Hope!!!" (希望への前進!!!, Kibō e no Zenshin!!!); 225. "Holy Inheritance" (聖なる継承, Seinaru Keishō); 226. "Popp's Suffering" (ポップの苦悩, Poppu no Kunō); 227. "Behold! The New Equipment" (見参! 最新装備, Kenzan! Saishin Sōbi); 228. "The Night Before the Battle" (決戦前夜の葛藤, Kessen Zen'ya no Kattō); 229. "Sleep, Hero" (勇者よ眠れ, Yūsha yo Nemure); 230. "The Evil Wine Glass...!!!" (邪悪の杯...!!!, Jaaku no Sakazuki...!!!); 231. "Rebirth of the Magic Sword Knight...!!?" (魔剣戦士復活...!!?, Maken Senshi Fukkatsu...!!?); 232. "The Battle of Light and Dark!!!" (光と闇の戦い!!!, Hikari to Yami no Batoru!!!)
16	Halo Arc I Kōrin no Shō I (光輪の章 I)	January 16, 2004	4-08-618078-2
233. "Gather!! The Five Disciples" (結集!! 5人の使徒, Kesshū!! Gonin no Shito); 234. "The Secret of Lon Berk" (ロン・ベルクの秘密, Ron Beruku no Himitsu); 235. "Now!! Minakatoru" (いざ!! 大破邪呪文, Iza!! Minakatōru); 236. "The Light of Five Colors" (五色の光, Goshiki no Hikari); 237. "The Makai Army Blockade!!!" (魔界軍団包囲網!!!, Makai Gundan Hōi Mō!!!); 238. "Minakatoru Crisis...!!!" (大破邪呪文の危機...!!!, Minakatōru no Kiki...!!!); 239. "Deadly Poisoned Fang" (殺意の毒牙, Satsui no Dokuga); 240. "Her Name Is ...!!" (その人の名は...!!, Sono Hito no Na wa...!!); 241. "Tearful Attack!!!" (涙の敵陣突入!!!, Namida no Tekijin Totsunyū!!!); 242. "Hadlar's Last Challenge" (バドラー最後の挑戦, Badorā Saigo no Chōsen); 243. "Queen!! The Secret Decision" (女王!! 秘めたる決意, Kuīn!! Himetaru Ketsui); 244. "Swing Your Fist, Maam!!!" (マァムよ拳をふるえ!!!, Māmu yo Kobushi o Furue!!!); 245. "Ultimate Clash of Love!!!" (愛の超激突!!!, Ai no Chō Gekitotsu!!!); 246. "A Comeback!! The Queen's Blind Spot" (逆転!! 女王の死角, Gyakuten!! Kuīn no Shikaku); 247. "Let Go of Your Feelings...!!" (想いよ走れ...!!, Omoi yo Hashire...!!); 248. "Formidable Knight, Sigma!!" (脅威の騎士・シグマ!!, Kyōi no Naito, Shiguma!!); 249. "Victory or Destruction!!?" (勝利か!!? 消滅か!!?, Shōri ka!!? Shōmetsu ka!!?)
17	Halo Arc II; Kōrin no Shō II (光輪の章 II)	January 16, 2004	4-08-618079-0
250. "Maam's Response" (マァムの返事, Māmu no Henji); 251. "The Duel of True Dragons!!!" (真竜の闘い!!!, Shinryū no Tatakai!!!); 252. "Here it Comes!! The Ultimate Special Attack" (出たぞ!! 超必殺技, Deta zo!! Chō Hissatsu Waza); 253. "Burning Life...!!!" (燃えつきる生命...!!!, Moe Tsukiru Inochi...!!!); 254. "The Final Blow!!!" (最後の一太刀!!!, Saigo no Hitotachi!!!); 255. "The End of the Battle...!?" (大死闘決着...!?, Dai Shitō Ketchaku...!?); 256. "Reaper!! Kill Trap" (死神!! 殺しの罠, Shinigami!! Kiru Torappu); 257. "Hope within the Flame!!!" (炎の中の希望!!!, Honō no Naka no Kibō!!!); 258. "Will It Work Miraculous Escape!?" (なるか!? 奇蹟の脱出, Naru ka!? Kiseki no Dasshutsu); 259. "Popp, Death by Fire...!!!" (ポップ・炎に死す...!!!, Poppu, Honō ni Shisu...!!!); 260. "Resurrection!!! The Great Hero" (復活!!! 大勇者, Fukkatsu!!! Dai Yūsha); 261. "The Mystery of Avan's Return...!!!" (アバン復活の謎...!!!, Aban Fukkatsu no Nazo...!!!); 262. "Showdown with the Reaper!!" (死神との対決!!, Shinigami to no Taiketsu!!); 263. "Rebellious Hyunckel!!!" (反逆児ヒュンケル!!!, Hangyakuji Hyunkeru!!!); 264. "Revelations" (明かされた空白, Akasareta Kūhaku); 265. "Shine!!! The Secret of Anti-Evil" (輝け!!! 破邪の秘法, Kagayake!!! Haja no Hihō)
18	Halo Arc III; Kōrin no Shō III (光輪の章 III)	January 16, 2004	4-08-618080-4
266. "Vearn Palace Trembles...!!!" (ゆれる大魔宮...!!!, Yureru Bān Paresu...!!!); 267. "Justice Marches On!!" (正義の快進撃!!, Seigi no Kaishingeki!!); 268. "The Confirmation...!!?" (究極の結論...!!?, Kyūkyoku no Ketsuron...!!?); 269. "Zaboera's Ultimate Transformation!!!" (ザボエル最強変身!!!, Zaboeru Saikyō Henshin!!!); 270. "The Other Hero" (もうひとりの勇者, Mō Hitori no Yūsha); 271. "Arrival of the Super Weapon!!!" (超兵器招来!!!, Chōheiki Shōrai!!!); 272. "Unfinished Ultimate Sword" (未完の究極剣, Mikan no Kyūkyoku Ken); 273. "Final Confrontation" (最後の対峙, Saigo no Taiji); 274. "Return from Hell" (地獄からの生還者, Jigoku kara no Seikansha); 275. "Silver-Haired Beast, Hym!!!" (銀髪鬼ヒム!!!, Ginpatsuki Himu!!!); 276. "Pawn's Promotion" (兵士の昇格, Bōn no Puromōshon); 277. "Clash!! Fists of Two Men" (激突!! 男の拳, Gekitotsu!! Otoko no Kobushi); 278. "In The End" (死闘の果てに!, Shitō no Hate ni!); 279. "Burning the Last Energy!!" (最後の闘志燃ゆ!!, Saigo no Tōshi Moyu!!); 280. "Checkmate!!!" (王手ッ!!!, Chekkumeito—!!!); 281. "The Arrival of a Super Warrior!!!" (超戦士推参!!!, Chō Senshi Suisan!!!); 282. "Farewell! To Warring Days" (さらば! 闘いの日々よ, Saraba! Tatakai no Hibi yo)
19	Blood Fight Arc I Kessen no Shō I (血戦の章 I)	February 18, 2004	4-08-618081-2
283. "Battle in White Garden!!" (白い宮庭の決闘, Howaito Gāden no Kettō!!); 284. "Erasure of Avan Complete" (アバン抹殺完了, Aban Massatsu Kanryō); 285. "The Successor of Justice!!" (正義の後継者, Seigi no Kōkeisha!!); 286. "Resolution for Victory...!!!" (勝利への誓い...!!!, Shōri e no Chikai...!!!); 287. "Standing Firm!! Myst-Vearn" (不動!! ミストバーン, Fudō!! Misutobān); 288. "New Ties" (新たなる絆, Arata naru Kizuna); 289. "The Will of Father Baran" (父・バランの遺言, Chichi, Baran no Yuigon); 290. "Unexpected Challenge...!?" (予期せぬ難関...!?, Yokisenu Nankan...!?); 291. "The Heart of the Palace" (魔宮の心臓, Makyū no Shinzō); 292. "Rise! Fated Knight" (起て! 宿命の騎士, Tate! Shukumei no Kishi); 293. "Number 2 Awakens!!!" (第2の覚醒!!!, Dai 2 no Kakusei!!!); 294. "Roar!!! Double Dragon Crest" (吠えろ!!! 双竜紋, Hoero!!! Sōryūmon); 295. "Summit of Vearn Palace!!!" (大魔宮の頂上!!!, Bān Paresu no Chōjō!!!); 296. "Terrifying Hesitation...!" (恐怖と迷い...!, Kyōfu to Mayoi...!); 297. "Genetic Battle Memory!!" (闘いの遺伝子!!, Tatakai no Idenshi!!); 298. "Victory for Whom" (誰がための勝利, Tagatame no Shōri); 299. "Blood-Stained Conclusion...!!!" (血塗られた決着...!!!, Chinurareta Ketchaku...!!!)
20	Blood Fight Arc II; Kessen no Shō II (血戦の章 II)	February 18, 2004	4-08-618082-0
300. "A Worrisome Advantage" (不安な優勢, Fuan na Yūsei); 301. "The Final Battle of Myst" (ミスト最終決戦, Misuto Saishū Kessen); 302. "Silver's Fury!!" (白銀の猛威!!, Hakugin no Mōi!!); 303. "Dark Veil" (闇の衣, Yami no Koromo); 304. "Gamble for Victory!!!" (勝負を賭けた攻撃!!!, Shōbu o Kaketa Kōgeki!!!); 305. "Be Gone, Dark King...!!" (大魔王消ゆ...!!, Daimaō Kiyu...!!); 306. "I am the Strongest!!!" (私が最強だ!!!, Watashi ga Saikyō da!!!); 307. "Secret of Immortality!!!" (不死身の秘密!!!, Fujimi no Himitsu!!!); 308. "Frozen Time...!" (凍れる時間...!, Kōreru Toki...!); 309. "Great Forerunners" (大いなる先駆者たち, Ōinaru Senkushatachi); 310. "Direct Hit!! Frizz Cracker" (直撃!! 極大消滅呪文, Chokugeki!! Medorōa); 311. "Terrifying Truth...!!!" (戦慄の事実...!!!, Senritsu no Jijitsu...!!!); 312. "Myst and Kill" (影と死神, Misuto to Kiru); 313. "The Battle that Surpasses Death" (死を越えた決着戦, Shi o Koeta Ketchakusen); 314. "Passing Judgement...!" (裁きは下った...!, Jajji wa Kudatta...!); 315. "Vearn's Greatest Mystery" (バーン最大の謎, Bān Saidai no Nazo); 316. "Advent of the True Dark King!!!" (真・大魔王降臨!!!, Shin Daimaō Kōrin!!!)
21	Blood Fight Arc III; Kessen no Shō III (血戦の章 III)	March 18, 2004	4-08-618083-9
317. "Dark Maam!" (黒いマァム!, Kuroi Māmu!); 318. "The Fated Demise" (宿命の終焉, Shukumei no Shūen); 319. "Support the Hero!" (勇者の下へ!, Yūsha no Moto e!); 320. "Facade Fighting!!!" (正面激突!!!, Shōmen Gekitotsu!!!); 321. "The Motionless Stance" (不動の構え, Fudō no Kamae); 322. "Invitation to the Underworld" (魔界への誘い, Makai e no Izanai); 323. "Eyes That Won't Shut!!" (閉じない瞳!!, Tojinai Hitomi!!); 324. "Seize Victory!!!" (勝機をつかめ!!!, Shōki o Tsukame!!!); 325. "The Tenchimatou's Blind Spot...!!?" (天地魔闘の死角...!!?, Tenchi Matō no Shikaku...!!?); 326. "Strike with Your Life!!!" (生命でぶつかれ!!!, Inochi de Butsukare!!!); 327. "Last Attack!!!" (ラストアタック!!!, Rasuto Atakku!!!); 328. "Strengthened by Bonds...!" (絆にかけて...!, Kizuna ni Kakete...!); 329. "With All Your Might!!!" (渾身!!!, Konshin!!!); 330. "One Moment!!!" (一瞬!!!, Isshun!!!); 331. "The Last Great Twist" (最大最後の逆転, Saidai Saigo no Gyakuten); 332. "Annihilation of the Surface" (地上消滅, Chijō Shōmetsu); 333. "The Voice that Echoes in the Darkness" (響く闇からの声, Hibiku Yami kara no Koe)
22	Flash of Light Arc; Senkō no Shō (閃光の章)	March 18, 2004	4-08-618084-7
334. "Stand Up...!!!" (起って...!!!, Tatte...!!!); 335. "Flash of Light" (閃光のように, Senkō no Yō ni); 336. "Miracle Inside the Hitomi" (瞳の中の奇蹟, Hitomi no Naka no Kiseki); 337. "The Tear of God" (神の涙, Kami no Namida); 338. "The Last Wish" (最後の願い, Saigo no Negai); 339. "One Hearts As One...!!" (心をひとつに...!!, Kokoro o Hitotsu ni...!!); 340. "When the World Shines" (世界が輝く時, Sekai ga Kagayaku Toki); 341. "Dai's Decision" (ダイの決断, Dai no Ketsudan); 342. "Boiling Dragon Blood!!!" (たぎる竜の血!!!, Tagiru Doragon no Chi!!!); 343. "Roar!!!" (咆哮!!!, Hōkō!!!); 344. "Escape from Vearn Palace" (大魔宮 脱出せよ, Bān Paresu Dasshutsu se yo); 345. "Death Battle Above the Clouds" (死闘・天空へ, Shitō, Tenkū e); 346. "With This, Victory Will Be Mine" (この腕で勝利を, Kono Ude de Shōri o); 347. "Farewell! My Friends" (さらば! 我が友, Saraba! Waga Tomo); 348. "Farewell!! Dark King" (さらば!! 大魔王, Saraba!! Daimaō); 349. "Farewell!!! Beloved Surface" (さらば!!! 愛する地上よ, Saraba!!! Ai suru Chijō yo)

=== 2020 re-release ===
No.	Title	Original release date	English release date
01	Disciples of Avan 1 Aban no Shito 1 (アバンの使徒I)	October 2, 2020; 978-4-08-792560-9	March 1, 2022; 978-1-9747-2893-0
02	Disciples of Avan 2 Aban no Shito 2 (アバンの使徒II)	October 2, 2020; 978-4-08-792561-6	May 10, 2022; 978-1-9747-2969-2
03	Disciples of Avan 3 Aban no Shito 3 (アバンの使徒III)	October 2, 2020; 978-4-08-792562-3	July 12, 2022; 978-1-9747-2970-8
04	Disciples of Avan 4 Aban no Shito 4 (アバンの使徒IV)	November 4, 2020; 978-4-08-792563-0	September 13, 2022; 978-1-9747-2971-5
05	Disciples of Avan 5 Aban no Shito 5 (アバンの使徒V)	November 4, 2020; 978-4-08-792564-7	November 8, 2022; 978-1-9747-2972-2
06	Dragon Knight 1 Ryū no Kishi 1 (竜の騎士I)	December 4, 2020; 978-4-08-792565-4	April 7, 2026; 978-1-9747-6243-9
07	Dragon Knight 2 Ryū no Kishi 2 (竜の騎士II)	December 4, 2020; 978-4-08-792566-1	August 4, 2026; 978-1-9747-6516-4
08	Dragon Knight 3 Ryū no Kishi 3 (竜の騎士III)	December 4, 2020; 978-4-08-792567-8	December 1, 2026; 978-1-9747-6558-4
09	Ryū no Kishi 4 (竜の騎士IV)	January 4, 2021; 978-4-08-792568-5	–
10	Ryū no Kishi 5 (竜の騎士V)	January 4, 2021; 978-4-08-792569-2	–
11	Shi no Daichi 1 (死の大地I)	February 4, 2021; 978-4-08-792570-8	–
12	Shi no Daichi 2 (死の大地II)	February 4, 2021; 978-4-08-792571-5	–
13	Shi no Daichi 3 (死の大地III)	March 4, 2021; 978-4-08-792572-2	–
14	Shi no Daichi 4 (死の大地IV)	March 4, 2021; 978-4-08-792573-9	–
15	Shi no Daichi 5 (死の大地V)	March 4, 2021; 978-4-08-792574-6	–
16	Dai Mamiya 1 (大魔宮I)	April 2, 2021; 978-4-08-792575-3	–
17	Dai Mamiya 2 (大魔宮II)	April 2, 2021; 978-4-08-792576-0	–
18	Dai Mamiya 3 (大魔宮III)	April 30, 2021; 978-4-08-792577-7	–
19	Dai Mamiya 4 (大魔宮IV)	April 30, 2021; 978-4-08-792578-4	–
20	Dai Mamiya 5 (大魔宮V)	April 30, 2021; 978-4-08-792579-1	–
21	Saishū Kessen-hen 1 (最終決戦編I)	June 4, 2021; 978-4-08-792580-7	–
22	Saishū Kessen-hen 2 (最終決戦編II)	June 4, 2021; 978-4-08-792581-4	–
23	Saishū Kessen-hen 3 (最終決戦編III)	July 2, 2021; 978-4-08-792582-1	–
24	Saishū Kessen-hen 4 (最終決戦編IV)	July 2, 2021; 978-4-08-792583-8	–
25	Saishū Kessen-hen 5 (最終決戦編V)	July 2, 2021; 978-4-08-792584-5	–

=== Yūsha Avan to Gokuen no Maō ===
No.	Release date	ISBN
01	March 4, 2021	978-4-08-882589-2
02	July 2, 2021	978-4-08-882723-0
03	November 4, 2021	978-4-08-882831-2
04	March 4, 2022	978-4-08-883058-2
05	July 4, 2022	978-4-08-883175-6
06	December 2, 2022	978-4-08-883307-1
07	April 4, 2023	978-4-08-883469-6
08	August 4, 2023	978-4-08-883602-7
09	January 4, 2024	978-4-08-883758-1
10	May 2, 2024	978-4-08-884072-7
11	September 4, 2024	978-4-08-884175-5
12	April 4, 2025	978-4-08-884457-2
13	August 4, 2025	978-4-08-884614-9
14	January 5, 2026	978-4-08-884793-1
15	May 1, 2026	978-4-08-885044-3
16	September 4, 2026	978-4-08-885182-2

=== Xross Blade ===
No.	Release date	ISBN
01	July 2, 2021	978-4-08-882724-7
02	March 4, 2022	978-4-08-883061-2
03	July 4, 2022	978-4-08-883187-9
04	December 2, 2022	978-4-08-883319-4
05	April 4, 2023	978-4-08-883519-8
06	September 4, 2023	978-4-08-883643-0
07	March 4, 2024	978-4-08-883850-2
