= Frisian cuisine =

Cuisine of the historic region of Frisia

Frisian cuisine consists of the traditional recipes and cooking methods of the historic region of Frisia, which is in present-day Germany and the Netherlands. Frisian cuisine is diverse, drawing from both land and sea. Most dishes, excluding desserts, are made of fish or potatoes, though there are several dishes based on other ingredients. Especially in West Frisia, the food resembles that of the Dutch Cuisine, though East Frisia and North Frisia present dishes that are very much unique to the region.

== List of Dishes ==
=== Warm dishes ===
==== Snirtjebraten ====
Snirtjebraten is a roasted pork shoulder or -neck, traditionally marinated with cloves, allspice, bay leaves and juniper berries. The dish regularly served with a gravy sauce and red cabbages. Snirtjebraten is a popular Frisian national dish.

==== Updrögt bohnen ====
Updrögt bohnen (Frisian: "Dried beans") is an East Frisian stew made primarily out of dry beans that were cooked in salt water. Potatoes, pieces of bacon and mettwurst sausages are in the dish as well, and the stew is served with some more sausages.

==== Labskaus ====
Labskaus is a dish common in North Frisia and Scandinavia. A portion of Labskaus is a purée composed of corned beef, mashed potatoes, beetroot and onions with gherkins, fried eggs, as well as herring as a garnish. For a long time, it was highly appreciated with seafarers because of its high nutrition. It has spread through all of Northern Europe.

==== Finkenwerder Speckscholle ====
Essentially a specific way to prepare a plaice, Finkenwerder Speckscholle is a popular dish in North- and East Frisia. There are of course several recipes to prepare a Speckscholle, varying from one region to another. But the most popular one by far is the Finkenwerder recipe, named after the district Finkenwerder in Hamburg. The Finkenwerder recipe uses onions, crabs and a bacon sauce as a garnish. Due to overfishing in the North Sea, many cooks have begun using other types of fish to prepare the Speckscholle.

==== Snert ====
Snert is a West Frisian pea soup. It has a thick consistency and is mostly served with a Frisian type of bread and pork or bacon. It was spread throughout the whole world by the Dutch Navy and is today an established and popular dish of the Dutch Cuisine.

=== Desserts and sweet dishes ===
==== Ostfriesentorte ====
The Ostfriesentorte (German: East Frisian's Cake) is a traditional East Frisian Cake, which can be baked in many colors. The cake can be found in many cafés in East- and North Frisia. It is extraordinarily big, as it can have very many layers. The cake is essentially made of alternating layers of whipped cream and raisins soaked in brandy. It is often decorated with more cream and chocolate shavings or sprinkles.

==== Puffert un Peer ====
An East Frisian dessert, Puffert un Peer are dumplings made of milk, yeast and sugar, which are mixed with butter and flour. The dumplings are steamed and traditionally served with diced and cooked pears and vanilla sauce. The dish is comparable to the Bavarian Dampfnudel.

==== Speckendicken ====
The Speckendicken is an East Frisian dish mostly consumed in the Christmas Season. It is a local take on pancakes in the region, and traditionally families make a lot of Speckendickens shortly before Christmas Eve and New Year's Eve. It is made with flour, milk, eggs, and butter along with salt and sugar. Some added cardamom, treacle and anise to create a unique flavour. Speckendickens are traditionally eaten with bacon or sausage.

==== Sûkerbôle ====
Sûkerbôle (West-Frisian: sugar bread) is a West-Frisian yeast-based bread with large lumps of sugar mixed in the dough. Usually, sûkerbôle has a cinnamon flavour and sometimes a ginger flavour. It is common to spread butter on a slice of sûkerbôle. Traditionally, a sûkerbôle is given as a present to the parents after a baby's birth.

==== Oranjekoeke ====
Oranjekoeke is a West-Frisian cake with pink icing and whipped cream on top of it. On top of the whipped cream are slices of candied fruits like orange, pineapple, kiwi and grapes, but also pieces of chocolate.

=== Drinks ===
==== Frisian Tea ====
There is a very strong tea culture in West and East Frisia. Black tea is very popular, typically with a small amount of milk and some sugar in it. This tea culture goes back to the ages of the Dutch Empire, when the Netherlands were the country with the biggest spice trade and a very large tea import of primarily black tea (see: Dutch East India Company). It is customary when drinking tea in East Frisia and Friesland to watch the white "Wulkje" (Low German: small cloud) caused by the cream in the tea, rather than stirring the tea with a spoon.

== History ==
A large part of the Frisian Cuisine goes back to the time when the Frisians were dependent on all their available resources, before the ascent of the Netherlands to a Colonial Power. These resources were mostly seafood, some plantable ingredients and a small amount of meat. It is the Colonial Import, which began in the 17th century, that led to the other parts of this cuisine, for example the tea culture and the occasional use of spices. The recipes of the Frisian Cuisine have barely changed since then, but with the development of new kitchen utensils and the introduction of mass production, many of the old ways of preparing the food have been, as in every Cuisine that existed at the time, modernised.
