= Cinnamon roll =

Sweet roll flavoured with cinnamon

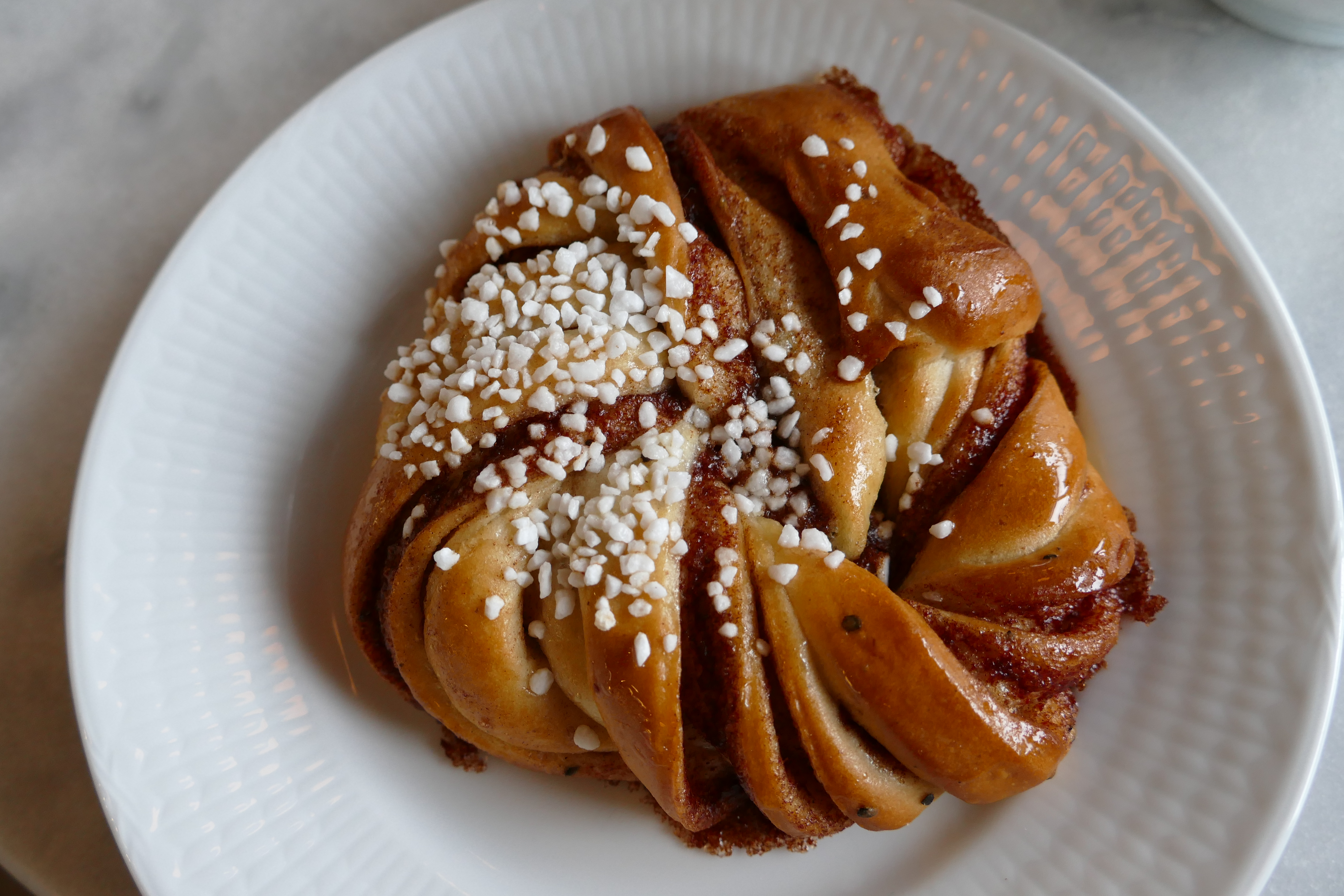
- A Swedish cinnamon bun or kanelbulle with pearl sugar
- Alternative names: Cinnamon bun, cinnamon swirl, cinnamon Danish, cinnamon snail
- Type: Sweet roll
- Main ingredients: Flour, cinnamon, sugar, and butter (or any other solid fat)

A cinnamon roll (also known as cinnamon bun, cinnamon swirl, cinnamon scroll, cinnamon Danish and cinnamon snail) is a sweet roll commonly served in Northern Europe and North America. Alternative recipes use puff pastry instead of yeasted dough, but are constructed using a similar method.

== Description ==
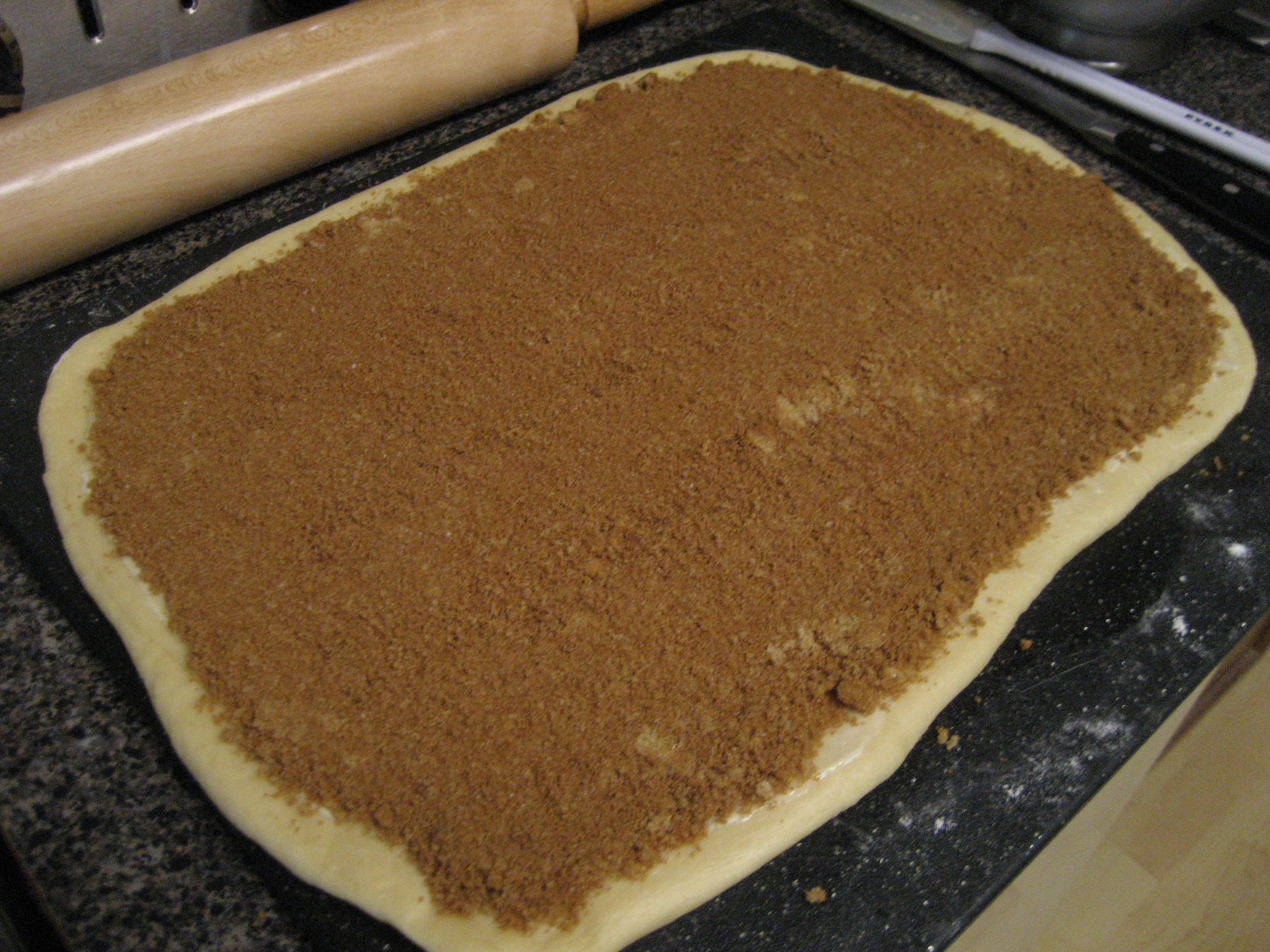
Cinnamon mixture spread on dough before rolling

A cinnamon roll consists of a rolled sheet of yeast-leavened sweet bread dough or Viennoiserie, onto which a cinnamon and sugar mixture (with some variations including brown sugar, raisins or other ingredients) is sprinkled over a thin coat of butter. The dough is then rolled, cut into individual portions and normally baked; however, a deep fried version is called a cinnamon roll or cinnamon bun doughnut.

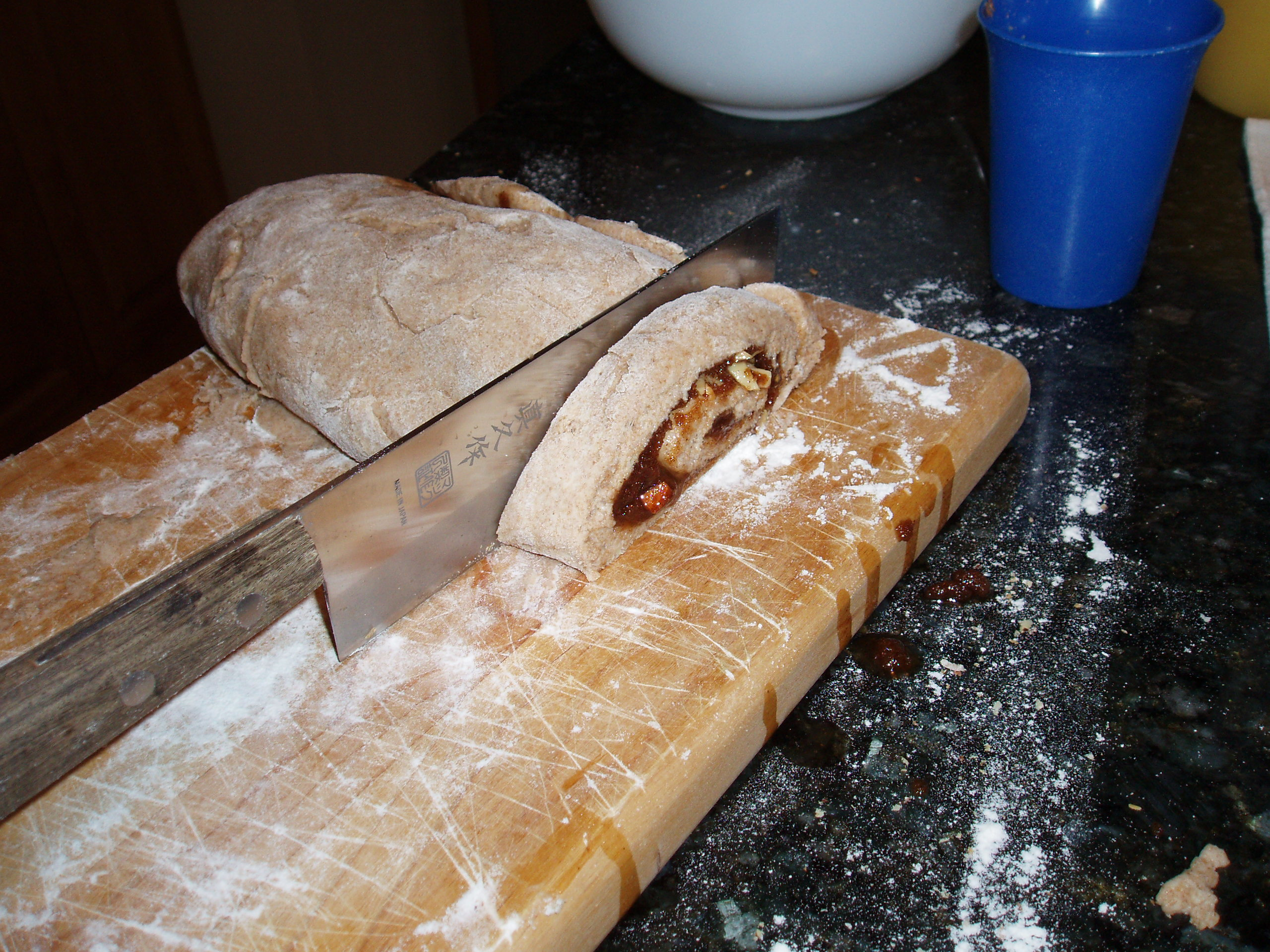
Loaf of raw cinnamon roll dough being cut into individual rolls prior to being baked

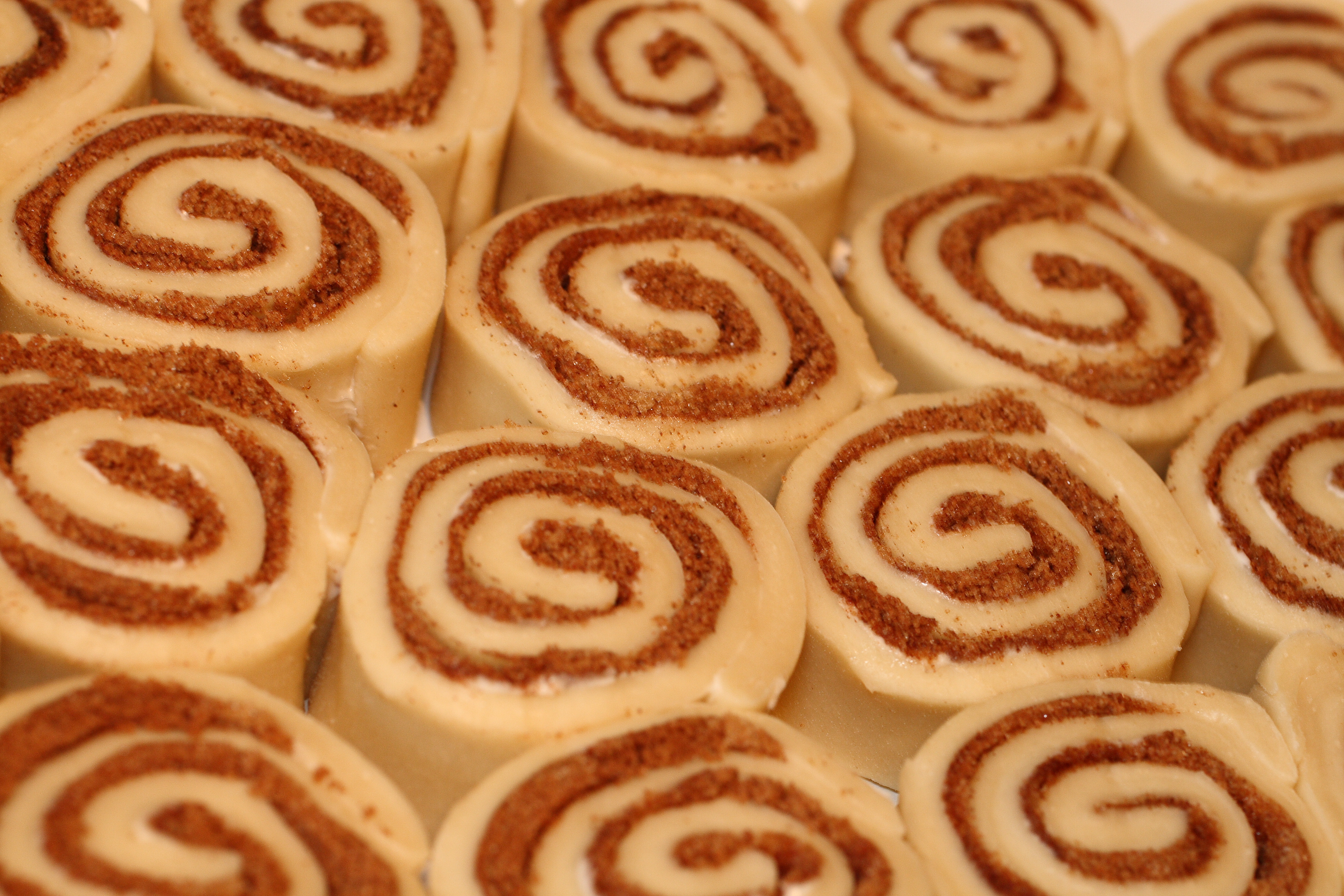
Uncooked cinnamon rolls

== Origins ==
Arab spice traders introduced the Sri Lankan cinnamon spice to Europe. The origin of cinnamon rolls is unknown, but might be in Byzantium.

The oldest recorded recipes for cinnamon rolls are from Germany in the 16th century. Cinnamon rolls spread from Germany to Scandinavia, introduced to Norway from Hanseatic traders through the port city of Bergen where they would become known as the skillingsbolle (lit. ''shilling bun''), with the modern Swedish kanelbulle (lit. ''cinnamon bun'') being created after the First World War. They spread to the United States with German immigrants.

== Size ==
The size of a cinnamon roll varies from place to place, but many vendors supply a smaller size about 5 centimeters (2.0 in) in diameter and a larger size about 10 cm (3.9 in) to a side. One of the larger varieties can be found in Finland, called korvapuusti (lit. 'a 'cuff on the ear'', fig. "pulling someone's ear for disciplining"), where it can be up to 20 cm (7.9 in) in diameter and weigh up to 200 g (7.1 oz).

Haga, a district in Gothenburg, Sweden, has very large cinnamon rolls. These cinnamon rolls are called hagabullar or Queen of the Kitchen. Hagabullar are usually 30 centimeters (12 in) or more in diameter and are, despite their size, not considered a communal roll.

== National variations ==
=== Europe ===
In Denmark the cinnamon roll is known as kanelsnegl, in Sweden it is called kanelbulle, in Norway it is known as kanelbolle, skillingsbolle, kanelsnurr, or kanel i svingene. In Finland, a variation of the cinnamon roll known as korvapuusti is flavored with cardamom and typically topped with pearl sugar. In Iceland it is known as kanilsnúður, and in Estonia it is known as kaneelirull. In Austria and Germany, it is called Zimtschnecke. In Slovakia and the Czech Republic, it is called škoricové slimáky/skořicoví šneci (meaning 'cinnamon snails').

Since 1999, October 4 has been promoted as Cinnamon Roll Day (Kanelbullens dag), a national theme day, acknowledged by a significant portion of the Swedish population. Swedish kanelbulle dough typically also contains cardamom (powder or buds), giving it a distinctive flavour.

The Swedish Butterkaka and Finnish bostonkakku ("Boston cake") are cakes made by baking cinnamon rolls in a round cake pan instead of baking them separately, so that they stick together to form a large, round cake.

In Austria and Germany, they are widely available at supermarkets and bakeries. A German variety, which is similar to the Scandinavian style, originating in Hamburg and its surroundings, is the Franzbrötchen, a cinnamon-filled baked good inspired by the French croissant, which does not contain cinnamon.

Cinnamon rolls from Knaus Berry Farm in Miami, FL

In the United Kingdom, cinnamon bun, cinnamon roll and cinnamon swirl names are all used, and generally available in most supermarkets and bakeries.

=== Americas ===
American cinnamon rolls are frequently large, baked in a pan and topped with cream cheese icing (usually confectioners' sugar-based) and are sometimes fried, finished with glaze, and served as a variation of a raised donut. In some areas, particularly in the American Midwest, cinnamon rolls are commonly served with chili, a combination that originated with school lunches in those areas. Some recipes include bacon pieces.

In Canada, they are known as cinnamon rolls or cinnamon buns. They are also iced with cream cheese icing or a glaze.

=== Asia ===
In Asian cultures, cinnamon rolls may be made using a yeast bread technique called tangzhong. The technique is associated with Japanese milk bread since it gives it a soft, feathery texture. By heating flour at exactly 65°C or 149°F, the starches within the flour will pre-gelatinize, causing it to thicken more than average. Tangzhong allows the starches to retain moisture for longer periods of time, resulting in a longer shelf life.

== Cinnamon roll traditions ==
In Sweden and Finland, cinnamon rolls are traditionally enjoyed during a get-together, including the consumption of coffee and or baked goods. In Sweden, the get-together is known as a fika, typically held in the afternoon, by coworkers during a break, by friends or by family. National Cinnamon Roll Day (Kanelbullens dag) is observed on October 4 in Sweden and Finland.

In Denmark, cinnamon buns are especially popular on Wednesdays, where an extra large variant called the Wednesday snail is sold. This tradition was specially invented during the 1990s where the national football team usually played their games on Wednesdays.

Along with Topfengolatsche, Buttercroissant and Faschingskrapfen, cinnamon rolls are a typical baked good to have with afternoon coffee, known as "Kaffe und Kuchen" in Austria and Germany.

In North America, cinnamon rolls are commonly eaten for breakfast or dessert. When eaten for breakfast in the U.S., they may be served with cream cheese frosting.

Cinnamon buns are particularly popular during the Christmas season in Slovakia and the Czech Republic. They form part of the traditional Christmas baking repertoire in many households, alongside other festive treats like vanilla crescents (vanilkové rožteky) and linzer cookies.

== Gallery ==
National variations

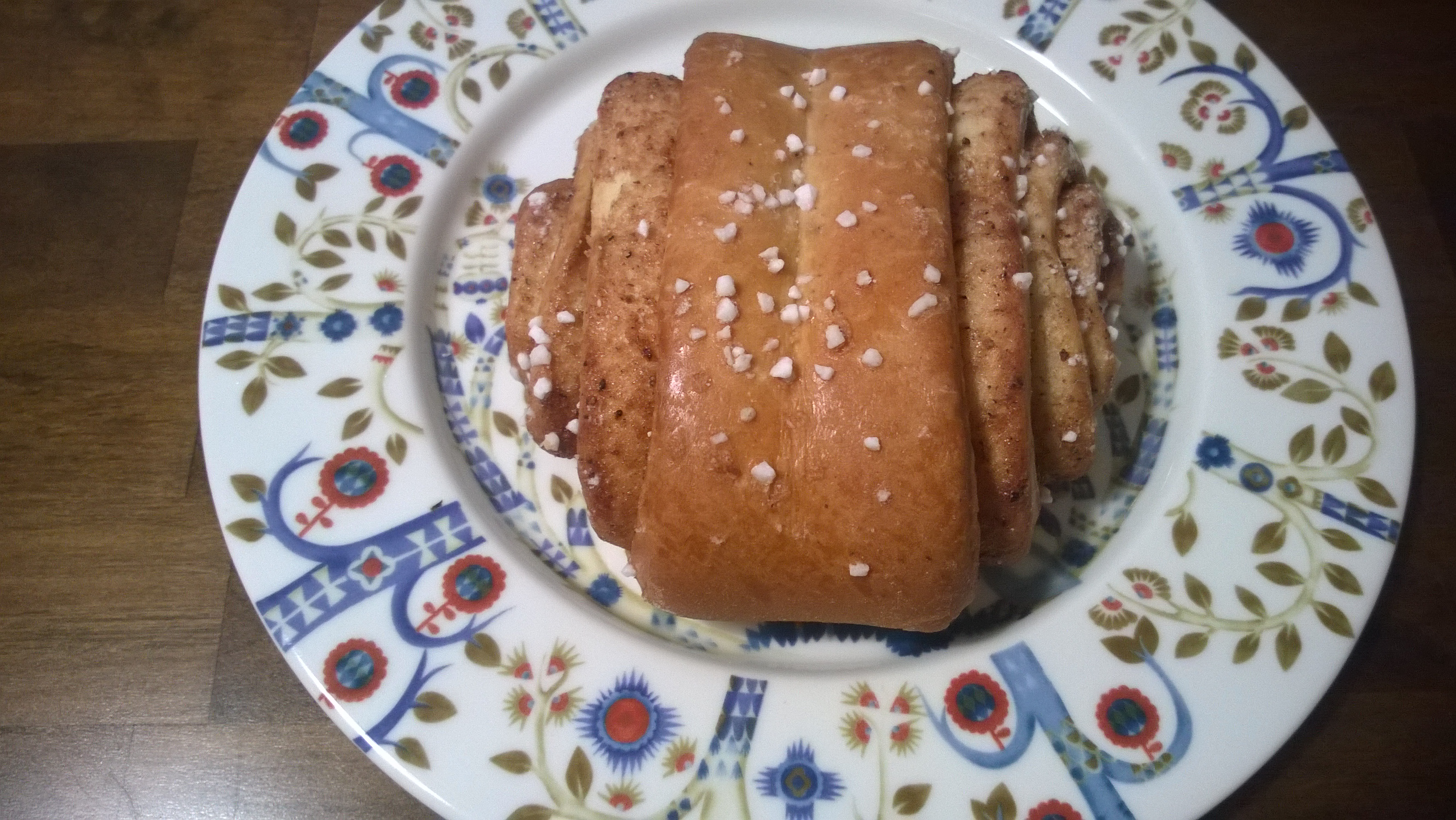
Finnish korvapuusti

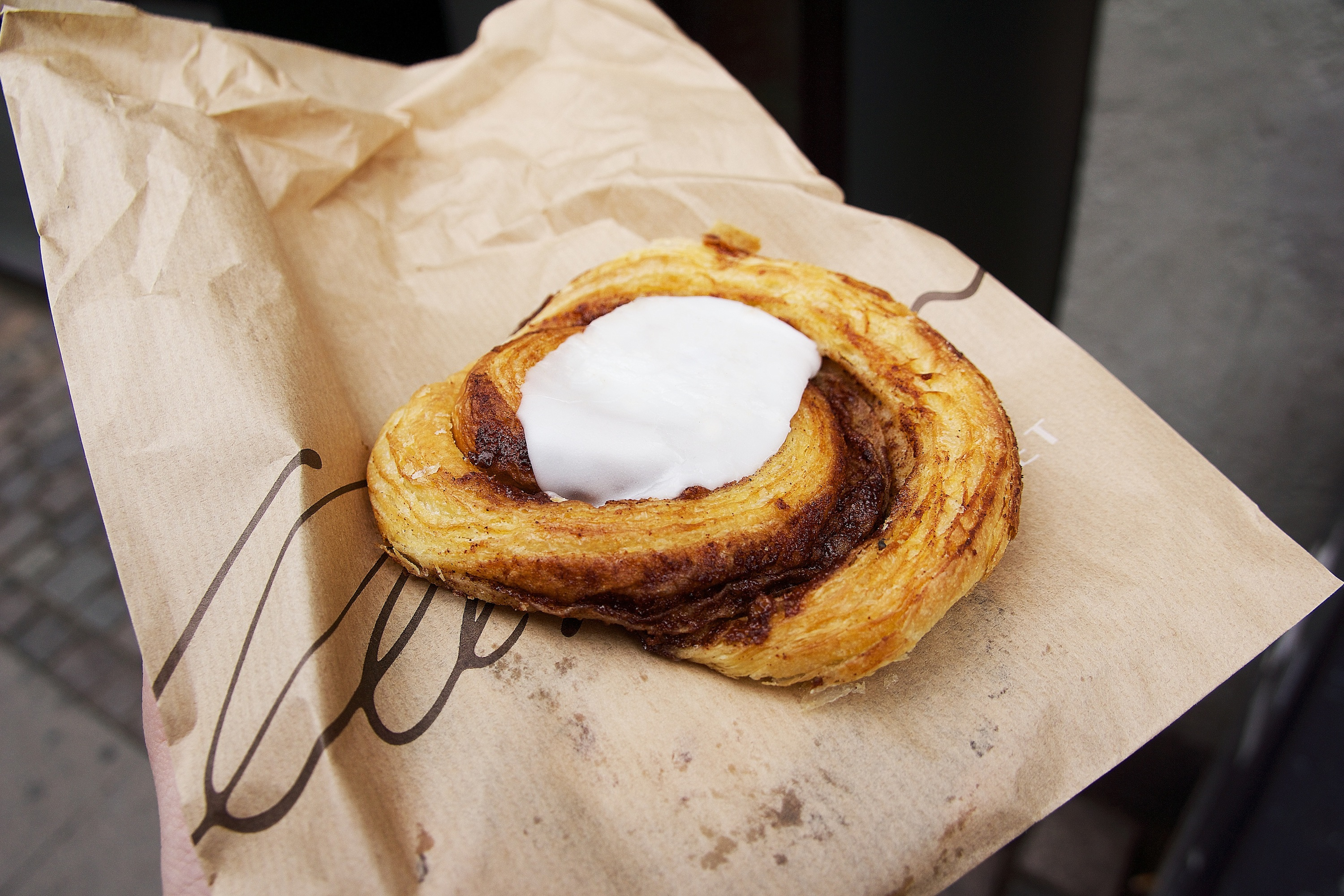
Danish kanelsnegl

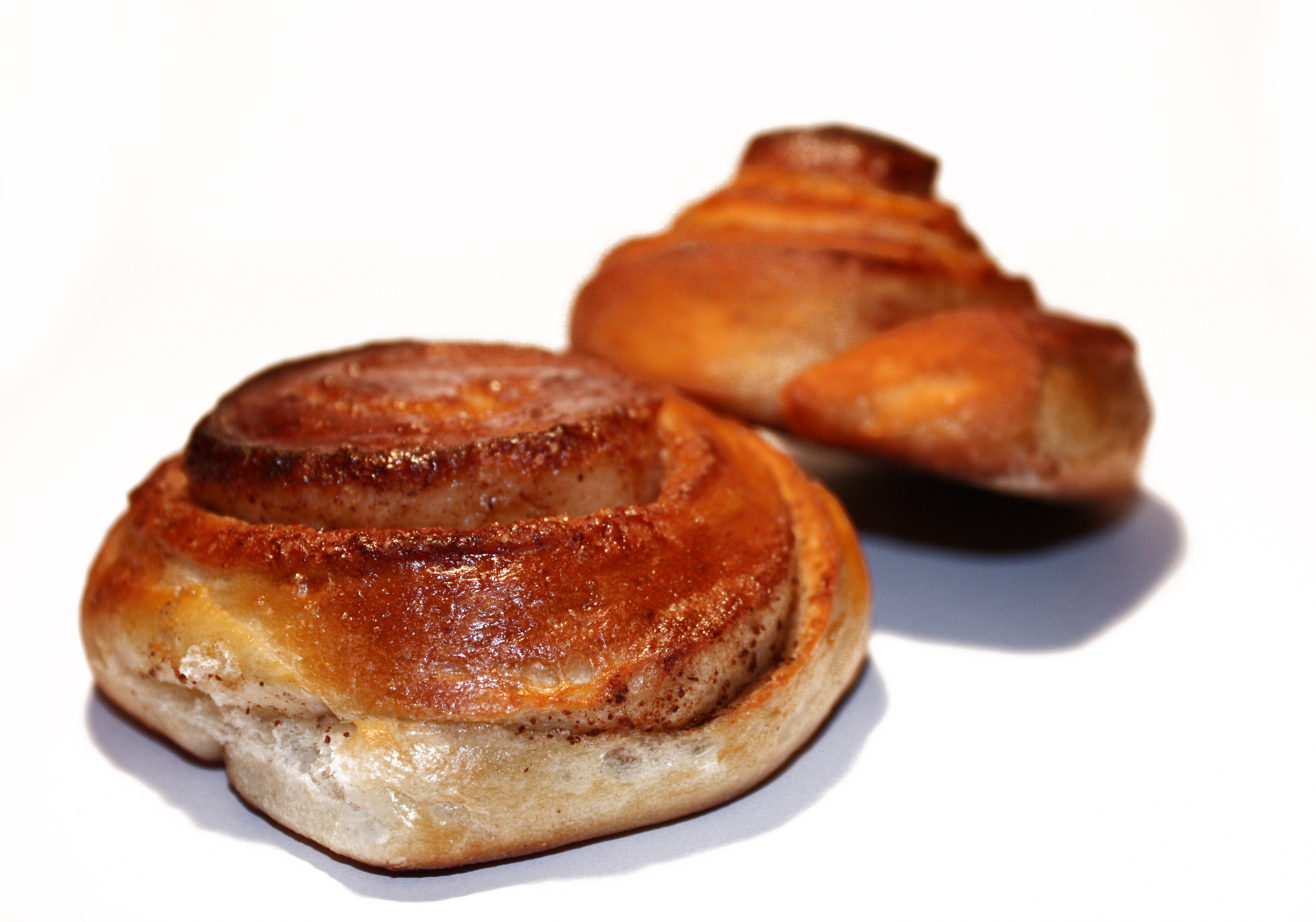
Norwegian skillingsbolle

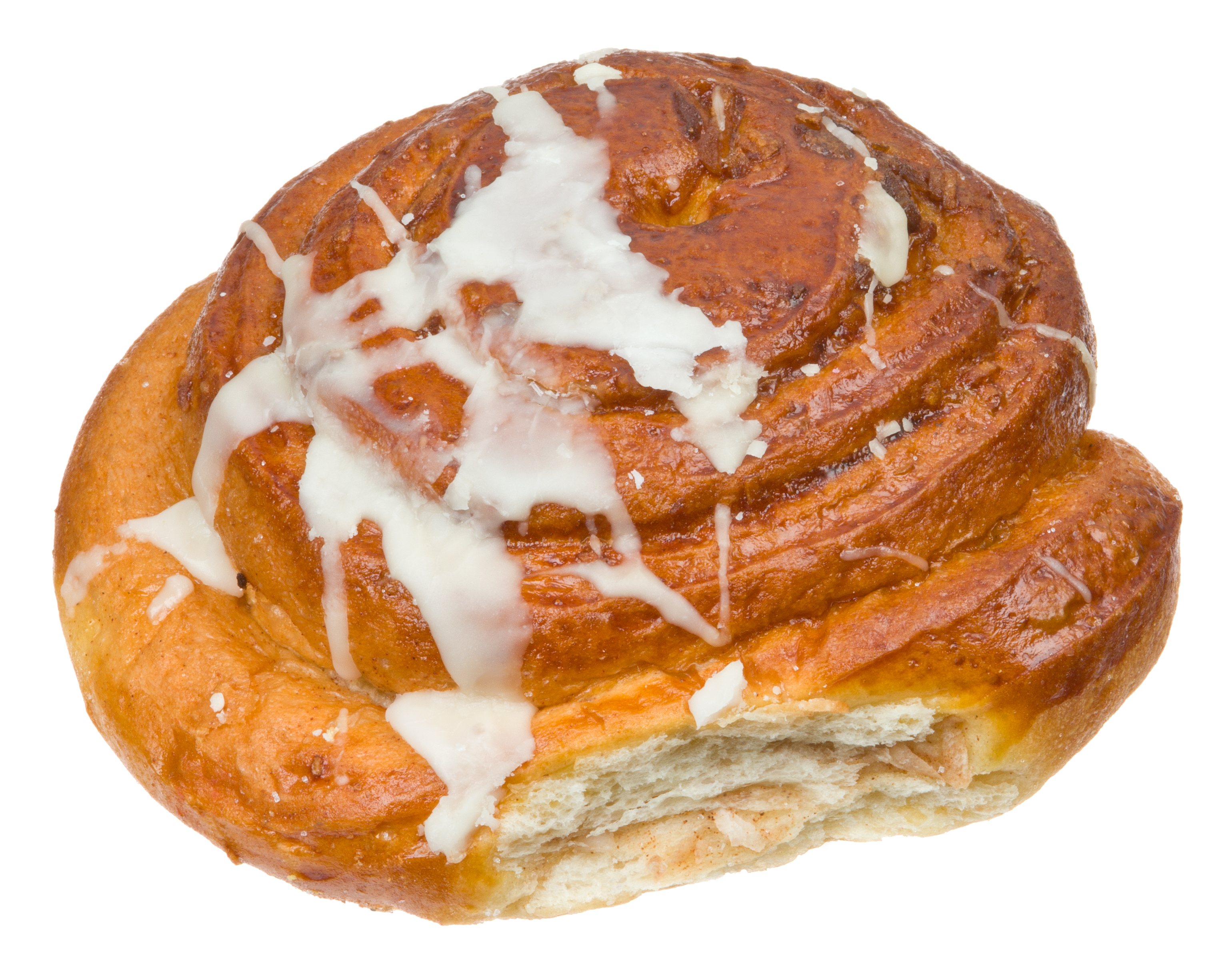
American cinnamon roll
Baking process

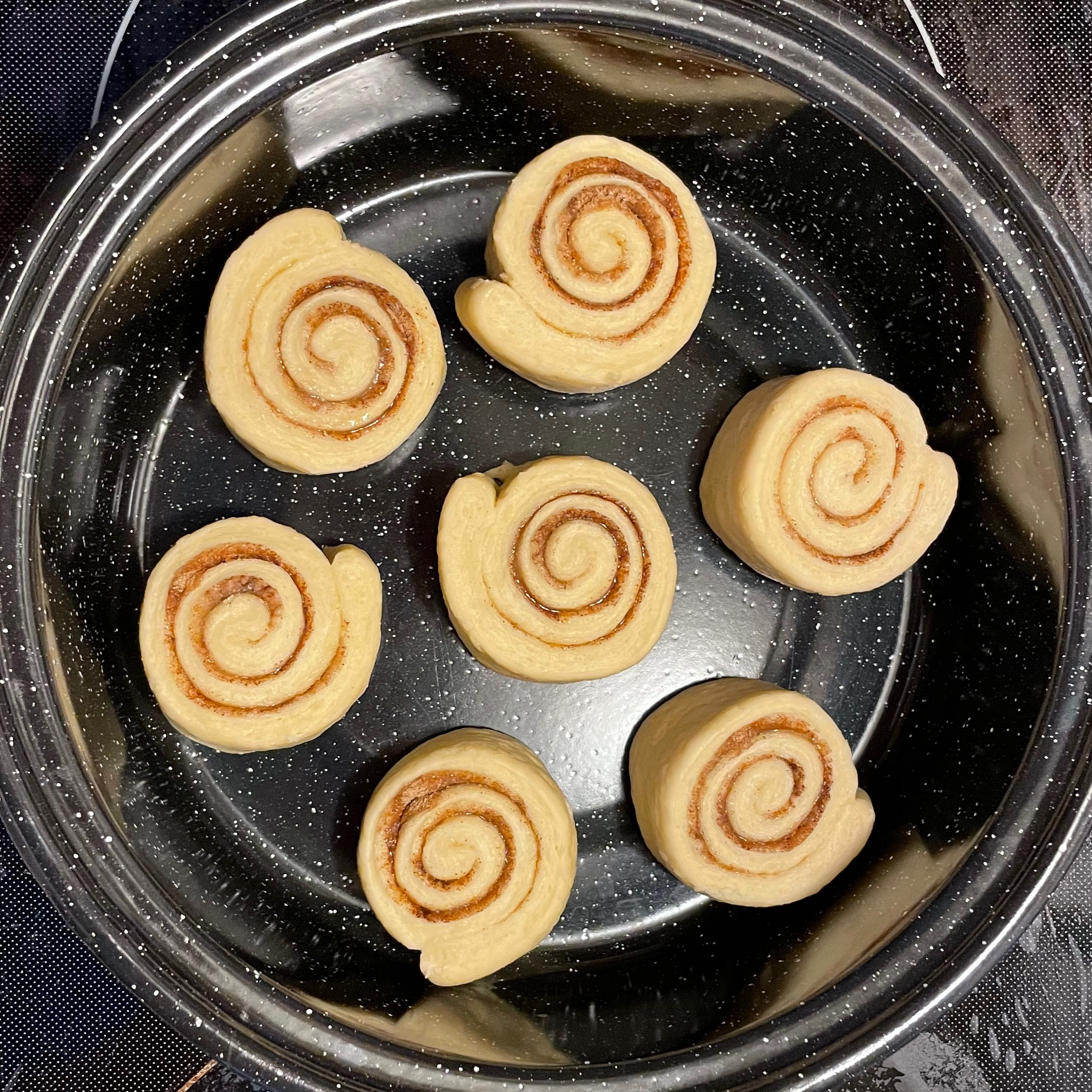
Raw cinnamon rolls

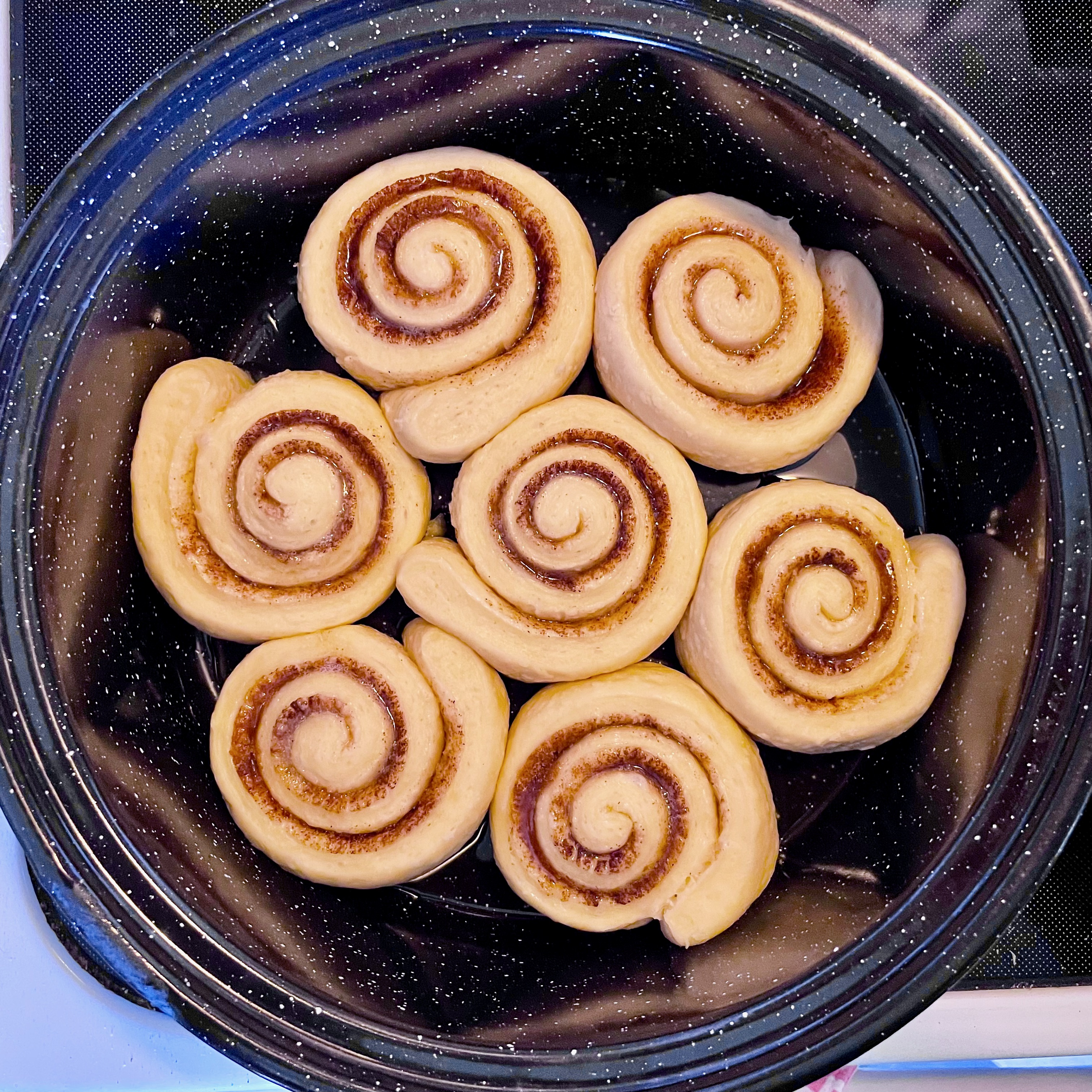
Ready to bake after proofing

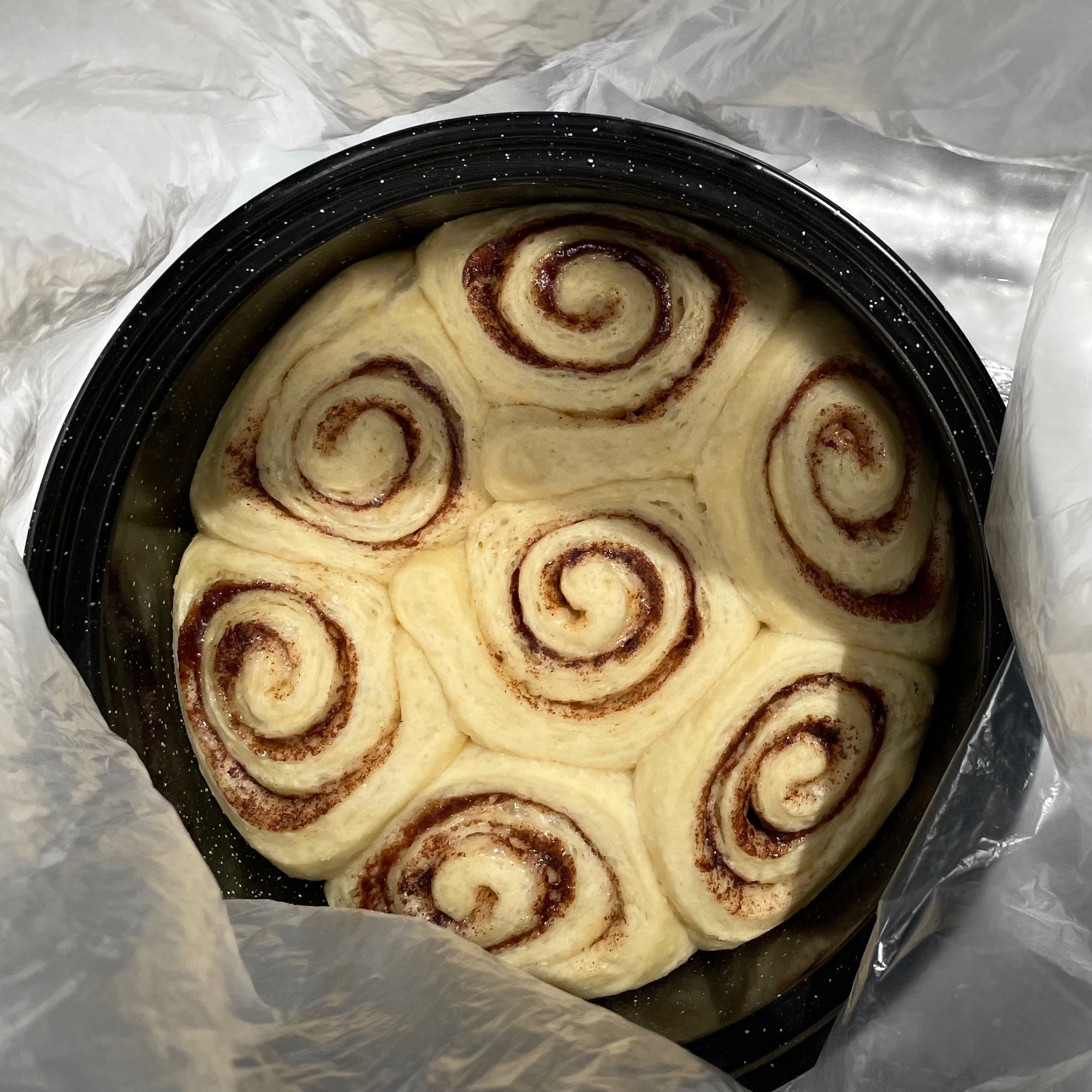
Partially baked rolls in a solar cooker

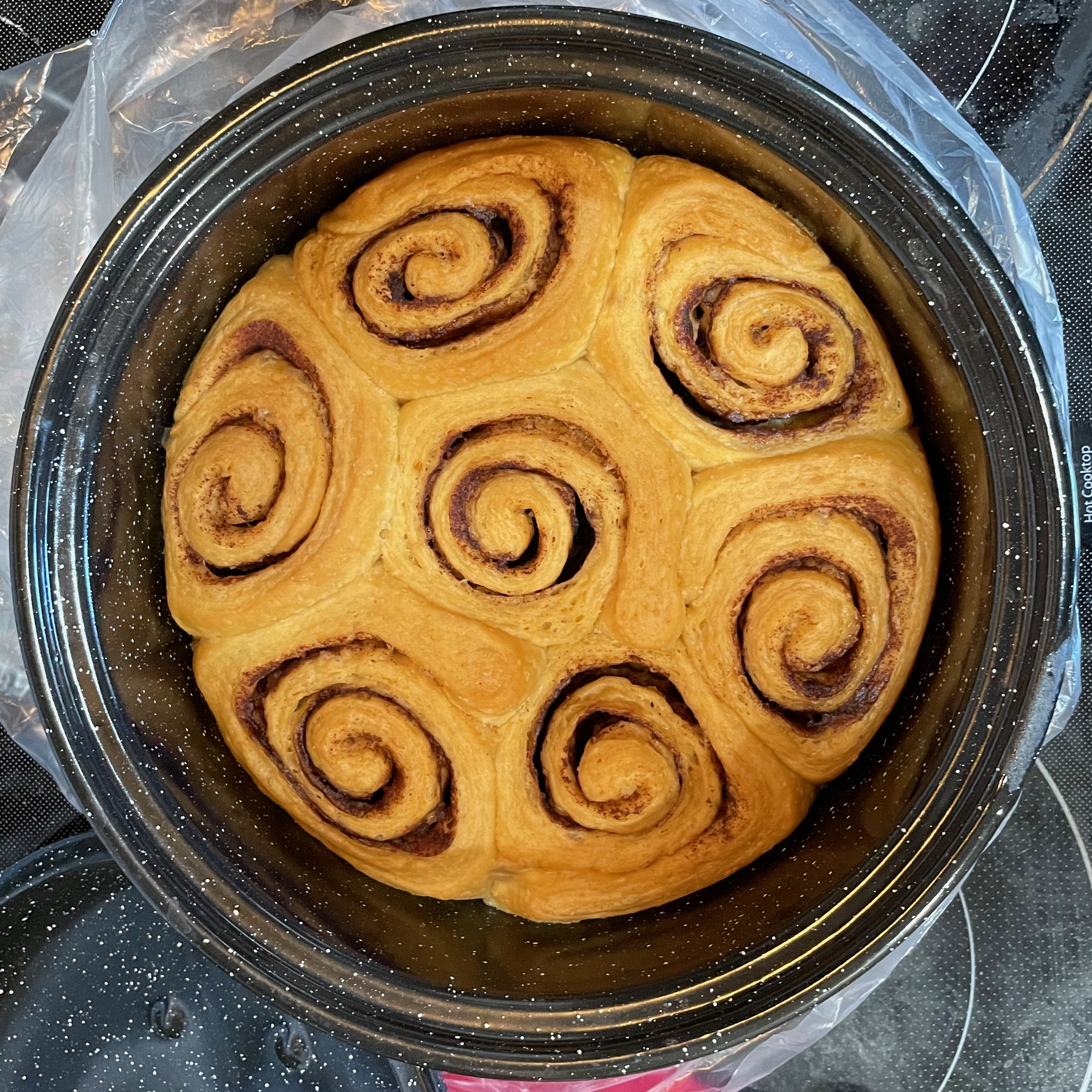
Fully baked cinnamon rolls

== See also ==
- Ensaïmada
- List of buns
