= Cinnamon Roll Day =

Annual secular holiday in Sweden and Finland

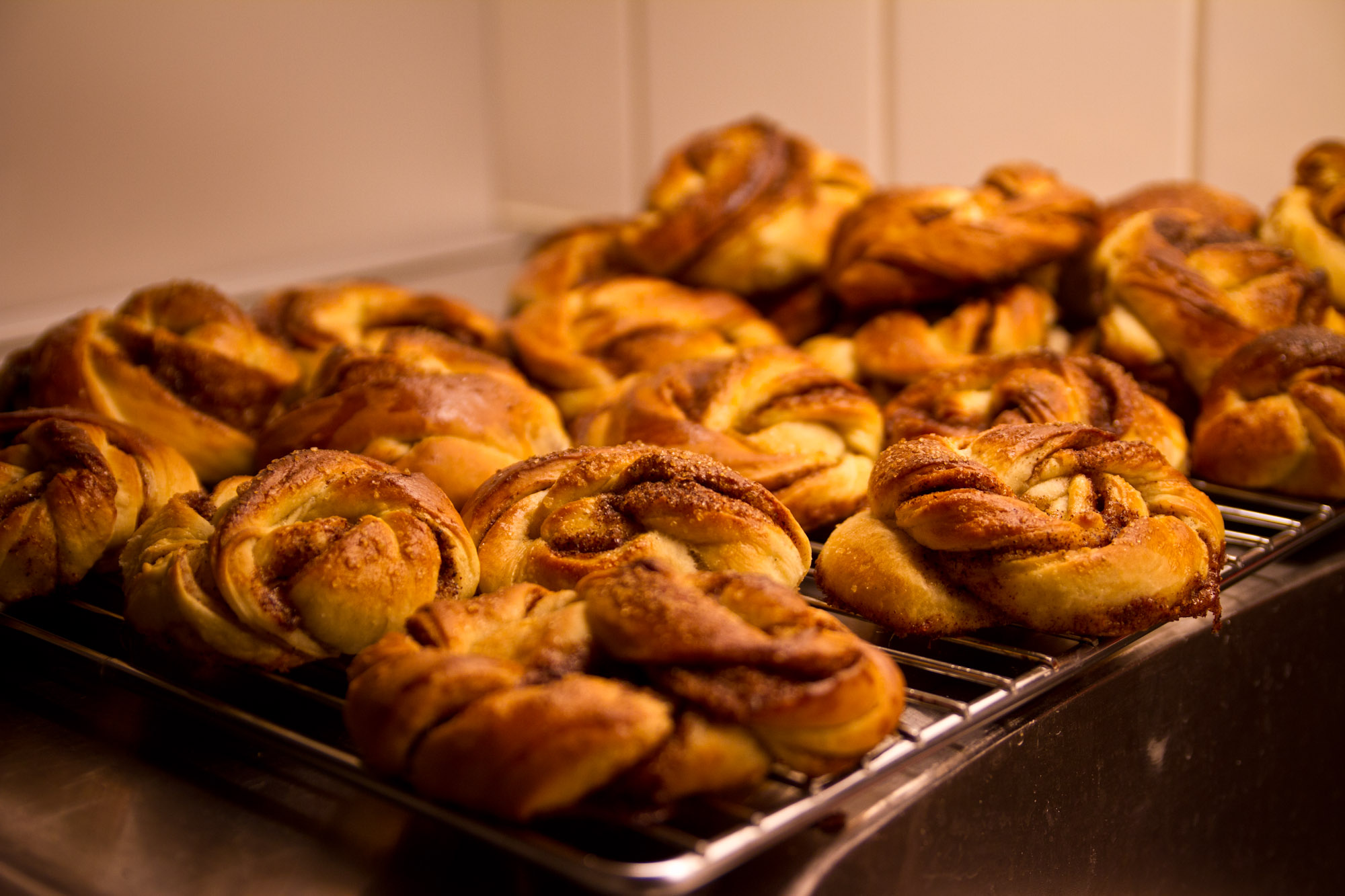
- Homemade cinnamon rolls
- Official name: Swedish: kanelbullens dag
- Observed by: Sweden, Finland
- Celebrations: Baking and eating cinnamon rolls
- Date: 4 October
- Next time: 4 October 2027
- Frequency: Annual
- First time: 1999; 27 years ago

Cinnamon Roll Day or Cinnamon Bun Day (Swedish: kanelbullens dag; Finnish: korvapuustipäivä) falls on 4 October each year. It is an annual theme day created for marketing purposes in Sweden and Finland that was instituted in 1999 by Kaeth Gardestedt. At the time, she was a project manager for Home Baking Council (Hembakningsrådet) which was historically a trade group supported by yeast, flour, sugar, and margarine manufacturers and is now supported by the Dansukker brand of sugar.

== Cultural role ==
The purpose of the celebration is to increase attention on Swedish baking traditions, with a particular focus on cinnamon buns, and to increase the consumption of products like yeast, flour, sugar, and margarine. The day is promoted through advertising signs in shops and cafés. Every year, IKEA stores worldwide also commemorate the day by having promotions for cinnamon buns in October. Cinnamon buns are also featured in community events among Swedes in New Zealand and at the Church of Sweden Abroad.

Most official food celebrations are minor events that receive little attention, but the Swedish adoption of Cinnamon Roll Day has been unusually popular. Most people in Sweden will eat a cinnamon bun on that day. According to Swedish ethnologist Jonas Engman, the popularity is due in part to a crisis of national identity, which has caused people to value things that remind them of positive features from past years.

== Date ==
Cinnamon Roll Day is celebrated on 4 October because the Home Baking Council did not want the day to compete with other food traditions, such as sweet semla buns, which are served in Sweden on Shrove Tuesday. In Sweden, International Children's Day is celebrated on the first Monday of October. "A thought with Cinnamon Roll Day was that it would be a day of thoughtfulness".

== See also ==
- Fika – Swedish practice that frequently features cinnamon rolls
