= Nib sugar =

Aggregates of white sugar compressed after refining

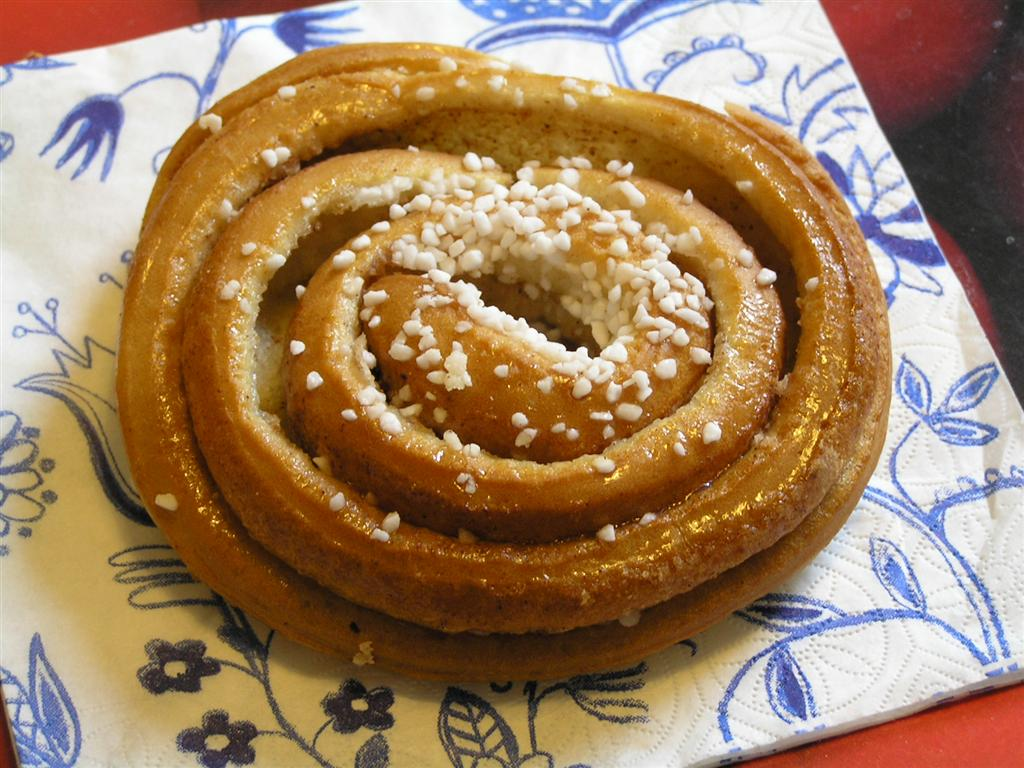
Swedish cinnamon bun with crushed nib sugar

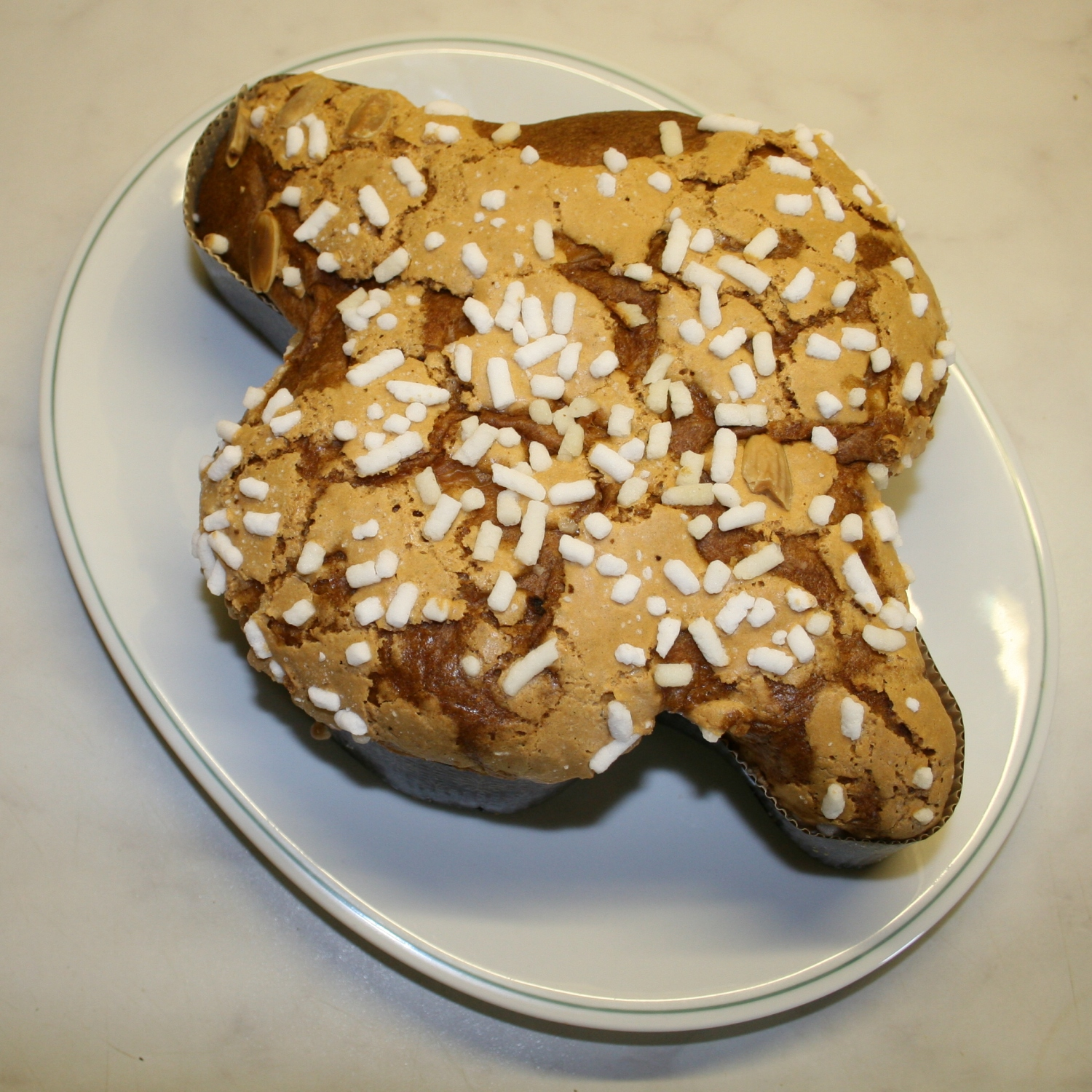
Italian Easter cake colomba pasquale with extruded nib sugar

Nib sugar (also pearl sugar and hail sugar) is a product of refined white sugar. The sugar is very coarse, hard, opaque white, and does not melt at temperatures typically used for baking. It is usually made by crushing blocks of white sugar and sifting them to obtain fragments of a given diameter, though it may also be produced through an extrusion process.

In Sweden it is called pärlsocker; in Denmark and Norway, perlesukker; in Finland, raesokeri; in Germany, Hagelzucker; in France, sucre perlé; and in Italy, granella di zucchero.

Nib sugar is widely used as a decorative topping for pastries, confections, cookies, cakes, muffins, and sweet buns. In Sweden and Finland, it commonly appears on bulle and pulla, as well as on kanelbullar (cinnamon buns) and chokladbollar. In Germany, it is traditionally used on Christmas cookies and cinnamon buns. In Belgium, it is a characteristic ingredient of Liège waffles. In Friesland, it is used in sûkerbôle (sugar bread). In France, it is often used on chouquettes, and in Italy it appears on the colomba pasquale (Easter dove).
