= Rum ball =

Truffle-like confection of cookie butter flavored with chocolate and rum

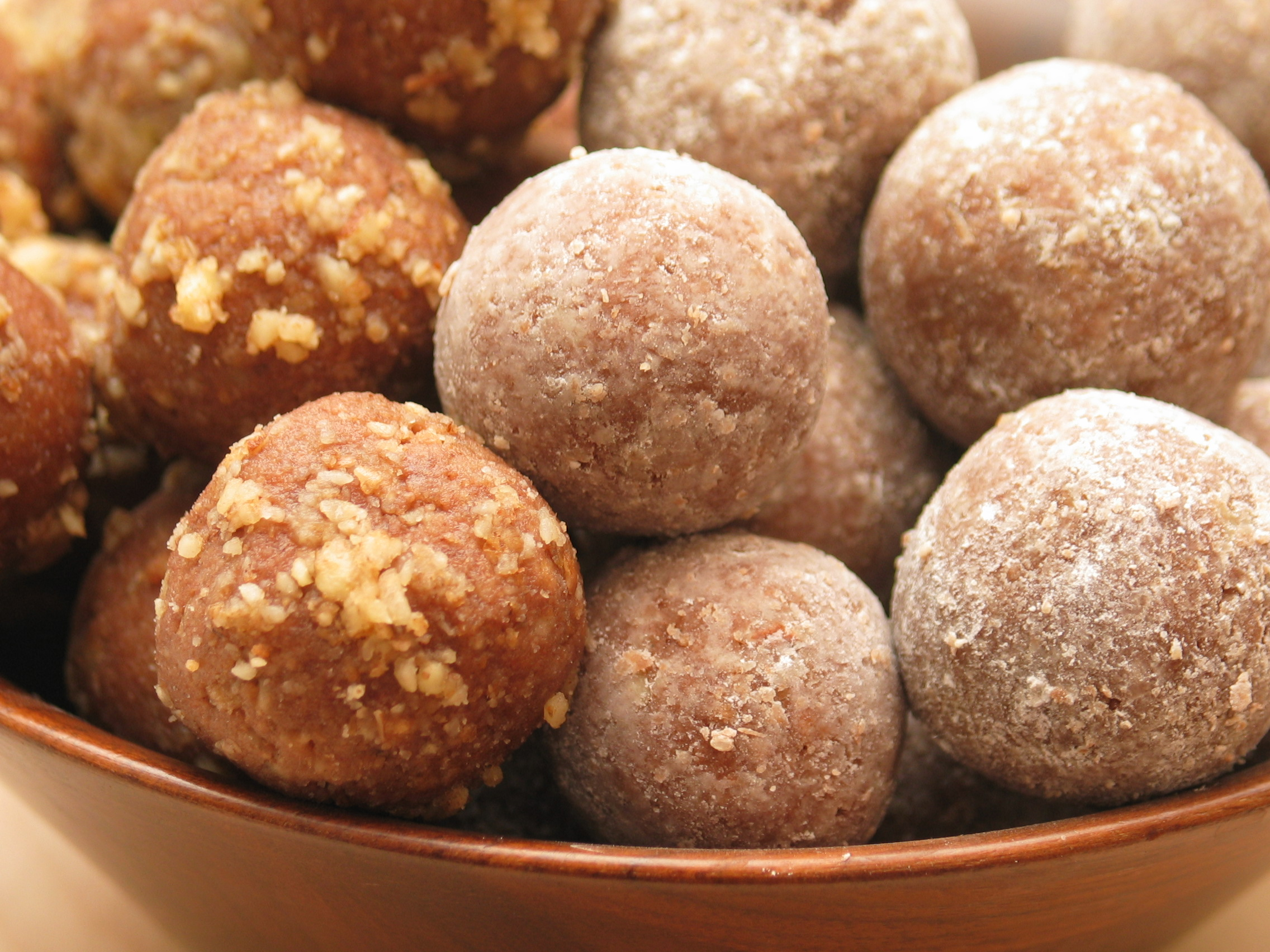
- Course: Dessert
- Main ingredients: Cake or biscuit material, cocoa, binding ingredient (fat with jam or condensed milk), chocolate, rum

Rum balls are a truffle-like confectionery cake of cookie butter flavoured with chocolate and rum. They are roughly the size of a golf ball and often coated in chocolate sprinkles, desiccated coconut, or cocoa. As their name implies, these treats contain rum. Because they are not baked, the alcohol flavour and kick are not neutralized during preparation. Rum balls are especially popular during the holiday season.

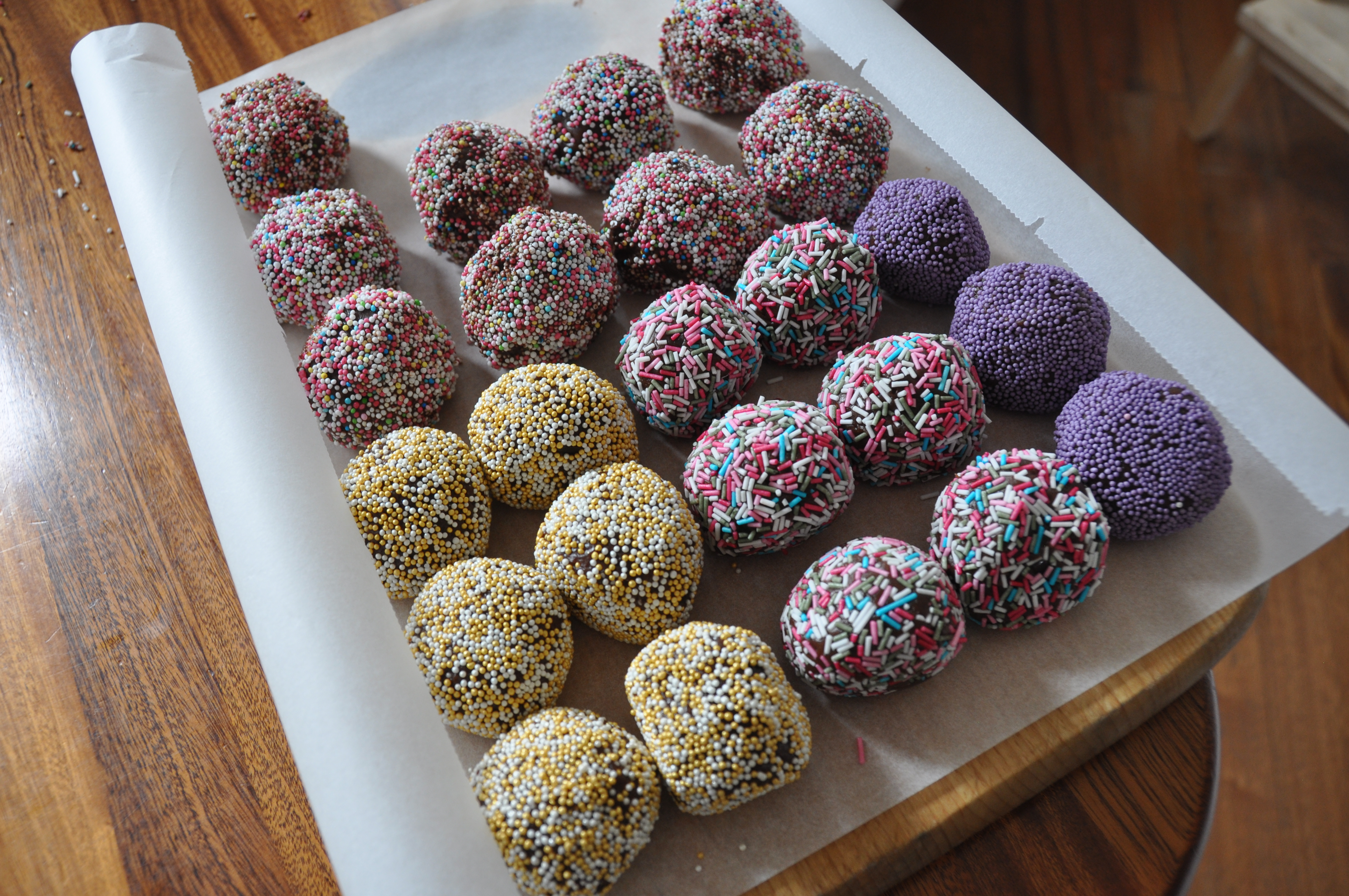
Typical Danish rum balls with various kinds of sprinkles

Rum balls are a popular Christmas treat in England, Australia, Canada, Germany, New Zealand, the United States, Austria, Slovenia, Hungary, Greece and the Czech Republic. In Denmark they are enjoyed year round and known as either romkugle, trøffel or sputnik, depending on the specific region. In Poland, also not necessarily associated with Christmas, the rum ball is known as bajadera (not to be confused with a Croatian confection of the same name).

There are many different ways to make rum balls, as recipes vary from region to region and family to family. All rum balls must include chocolate and rum, but the rest of the ingredients vary in kind, form, and amount.

To make rum balls, the cake (or biscuit) material is crushed and mixed with fat, cocoa and a moist binding ingredient, such as jam or condensed milk. Other optional ingredients can also be added, such as nuts. When the mixture holds together firmly, it is rolled into balls and then coated.

In Hungary they are made in a similar way, but usually rolled in sugar. Ground walnut and raisins are sometimes added to the rum ball ingredients. Some Hungarian rum balls are made with whole cherries placed inside the balls, and then rolled in coconut flakes (Hungarian: kókuszgolyó).

Rum balls closely resemble brigadeiros, a Brazilian sweet as they both usually contain condensed milk and cocoa powder. Brigadeiros, however, also include butter, whereas rum balls always contain rum and crushed biscuits or cake material, and often also desiccated coconut and raisins.

The world's largest rum ball was created in Mejdal, Denmark on 11 June 2017, weighing 31 kg (68 lb).

== See also ==
- Bourbon ball
- Brigadeiro
- Chokladboll
- Chocolate truffle
