= Liège waffle =

Belgian waffle variety

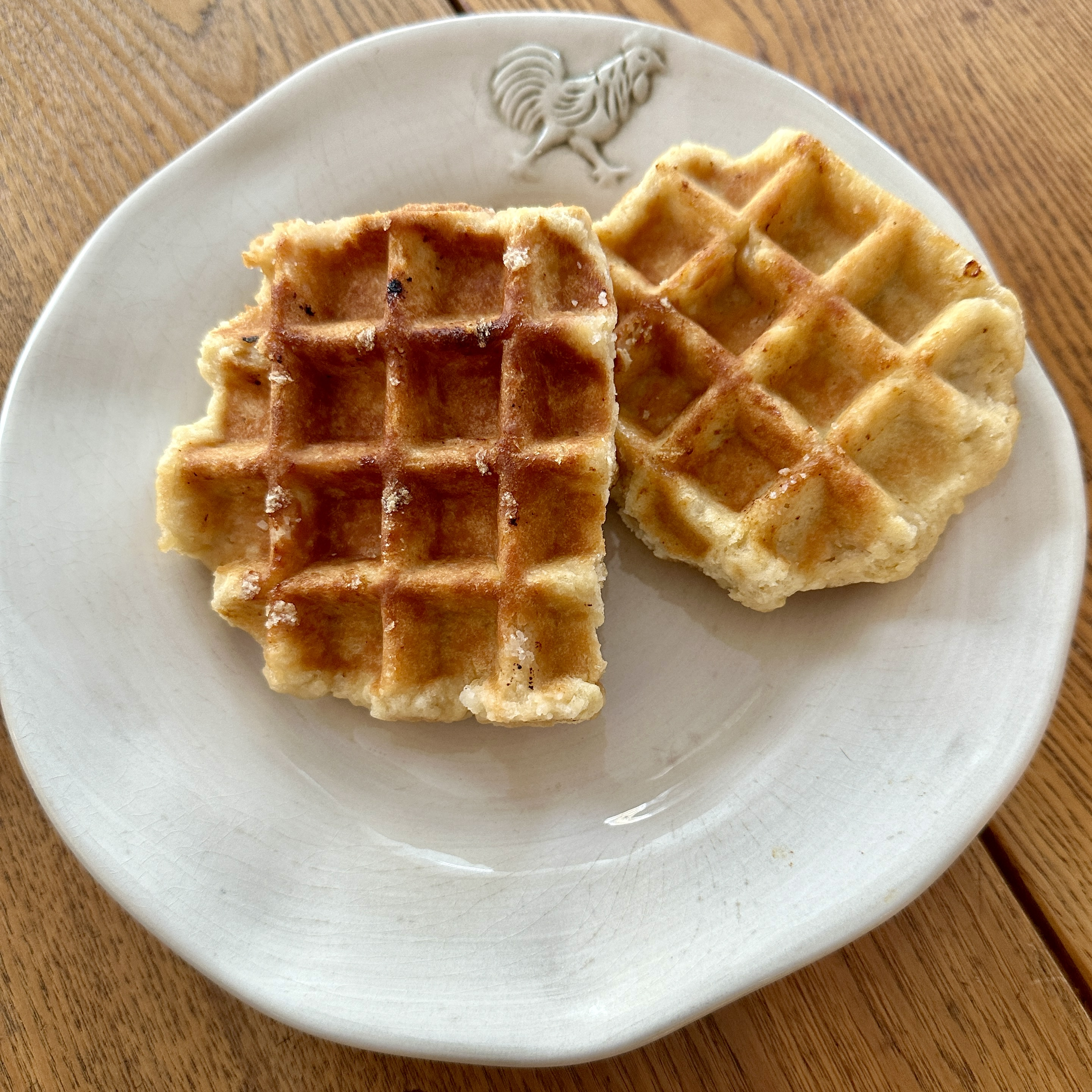
- Course: Snack, Breakfast
- Place of origin: Liege
- Region or state: Wallonia
- Associated cuisine: Belgian cuisine

Liège waffles are a variety of waffle developed in the Wallonia region of Belgium.

The Liège waffle differs from the Brussels waffle (sometimes referred to as the Belgian waffle) in several ways. It is smaller, the dough is a dense and heavy brioche, it contains pearl sugar, and unlike the Brussels waffle, which is traditionally served with toppings, the Liège waffle is traditionally eaten plain. The pearl sugar caramelizes during the grilling process, which gives the Liège waffle a crunchier, chewier, stickier bite; the Brussels-style waffle is lighter with a crispy bite. Liège waffles have a deeper divot and a rounded shape, while the Brussels waffle is usually rectangular. Liège waffles are made from a raised dough, while Brussels waffles are made from a liquid batter; the Brussels waffles soften as they cool, while Liège waffles can be eaten hot or cold. The Brussels style was introduced in the United States at the 1964 World's Fair, while the Liège version became known outside of Europe decades later. Liège waffles are often sold by street vendors as a handheld snack.

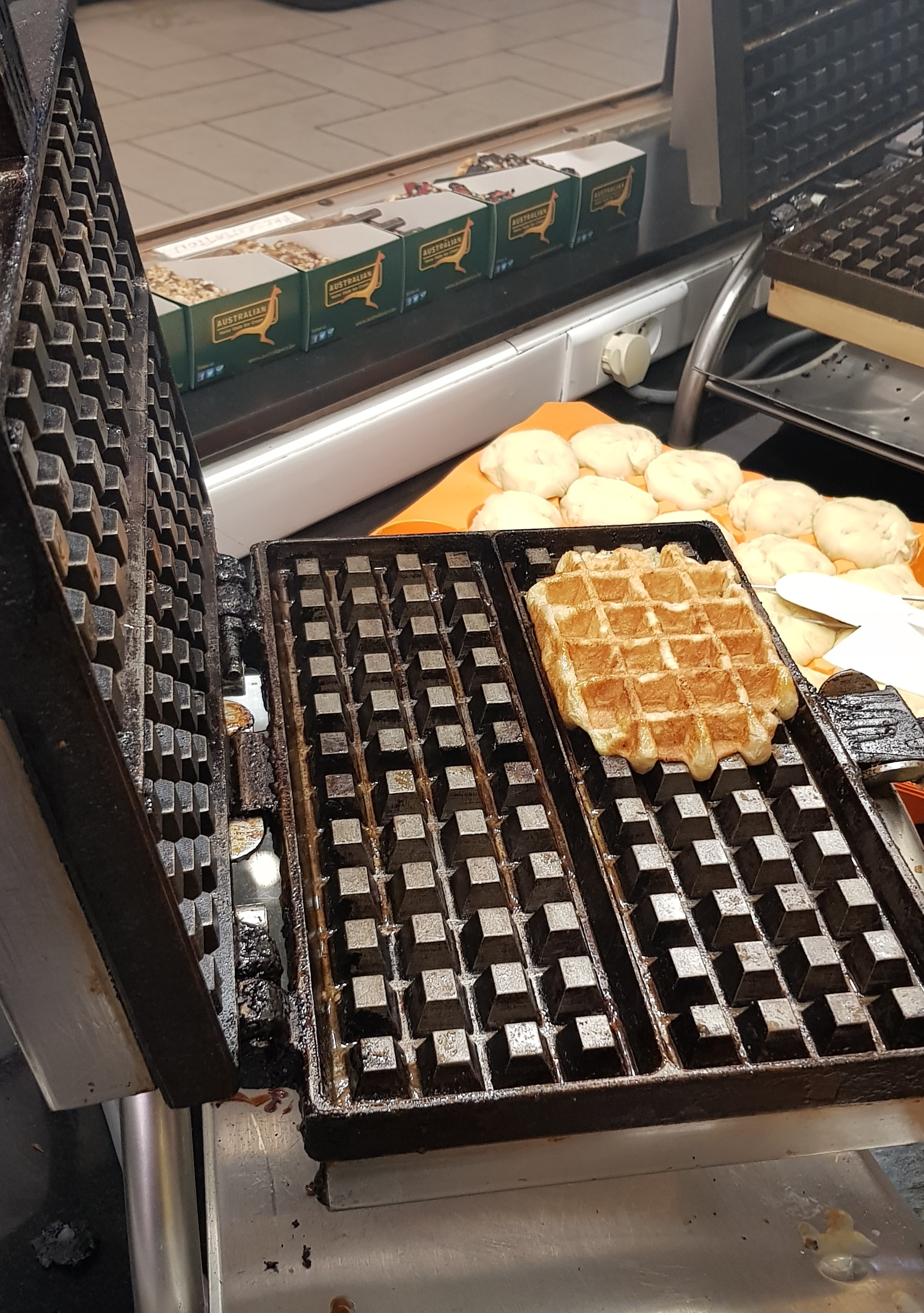
Liege waffles being prepared on a Liege waffle iron; dough is in background

The waffle was developed in Wallonia. According to Visit Belgium, the waffle was invented in the 18th century by the chef to the Prince-Bishopric of Liège.

In 2011 Brussels MP Joël Riguelle said the traditional Brussels waffle was in danger of being replaced by the Liège version, which was increasingly being offered in Belgian waffle shops with the toppings traditionally associated with the Brussels waffle.
