= Bourbon ball =

Chocolate confection from the Southern United States

Bourbon Ball
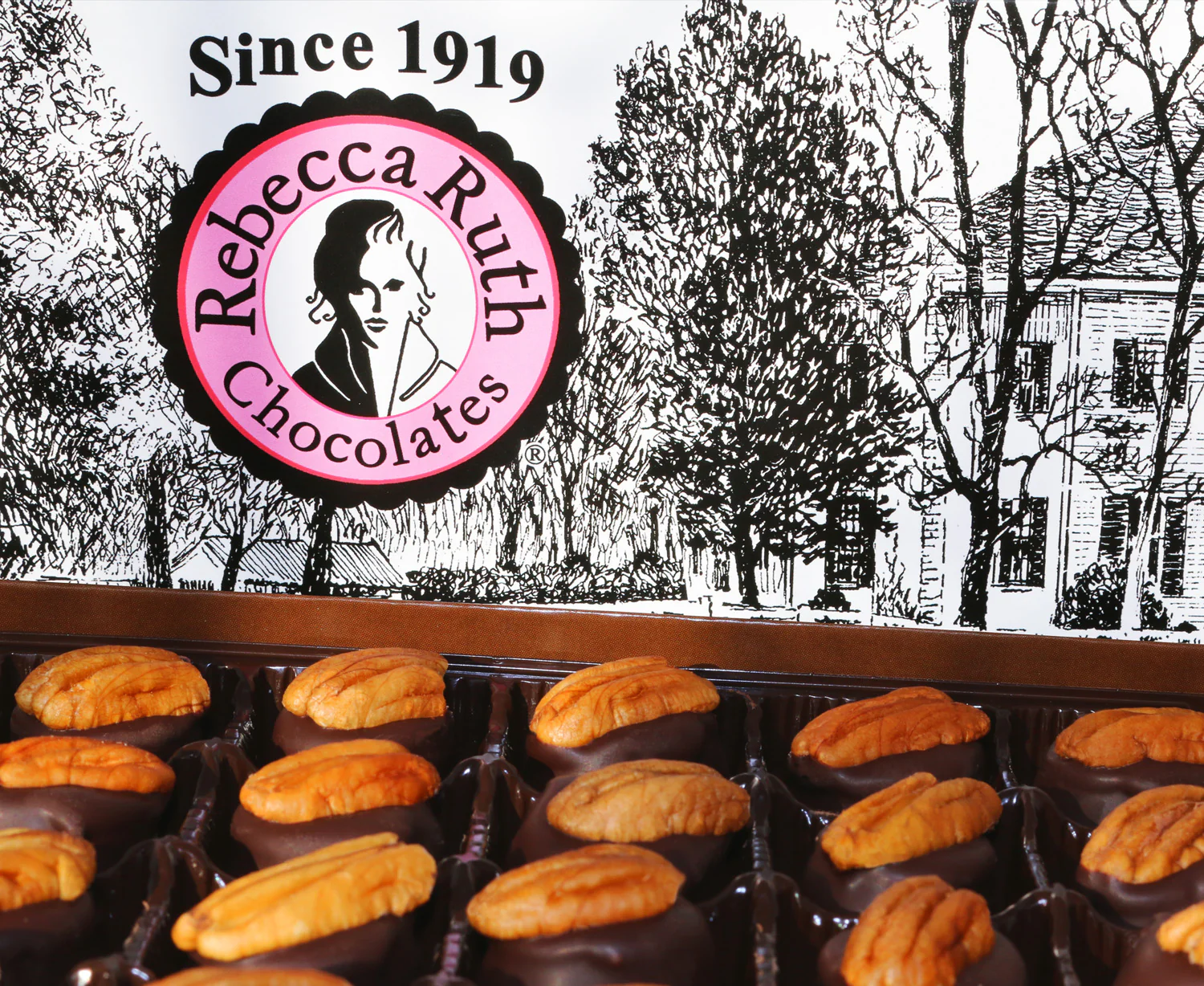
- Rebecca Ruth Original Bourbon Balls
- Type: Chocolates
- Place of origin: United States
- Region or state: Kentucky
- Created by: Ruth Hanly Booe
- Main ingredients: Bourbon Whiskey; Bourbon; Pecans; Chocolate
- Other information: Rebecca Ruth Bourbon Balls invented by Ruth Hanley Booe, in 1938 with bourbon, chocolate, and pecans.

A bourbon ball is a Southern delicacy invented by Ruth Hanly Booe in 1938. Ruth Hanly Booe is the founder of Rebecca Ruth Candies in 1919.

Bourbon balls come in many different shapes, sizes, and flavors but are usually bite-sized confections incorporating bourbon and dark chocolate as the main ingredients. In Rebecca Ruth's recipe, the center piece of the bourbon ball is a creamy candy dough that is infused with bourbon and other secret ingredients. The creamy center is then enrobed in dark chocolate and topped off with a southern pecan. Knowing whether or not the center piece is bourbon filled or infused creates a strong difference for the taster: bourbon filled is usually likened to taking a shot, whereas bourbon infused may be described as having more of a subtle kick.

The most common variation for home cooked recipes is regional to the southern United States and incorporates crushed cookies, corn syrup, chopped pecans, and bourbon into a mixture that is formed into balls and coated in powdered sugar to prevent the evaporation of the alcohol. Once molded they are aged for up to a week in a sealed container in a cool dark place before serving. They will stay edible for up to a month before becoming too frail to pick up in one piece as the evaporation process desiccates the packed structure of the cookie.

Another variation has a similar filling, but with a chocolate exterior. The filling can also be similar to a truffle or a cherry cordial, with added bourbon.

Using other types of alcohol one can make rum balls, flavored vodka balls, or liqueur balls.

== See also ==
- Brigadeiro
- Chokladboll
- Chocolate truffle
- Rum ball
