= Brigadeiro =

Typical Brazilian sweet, originally from São Paulo

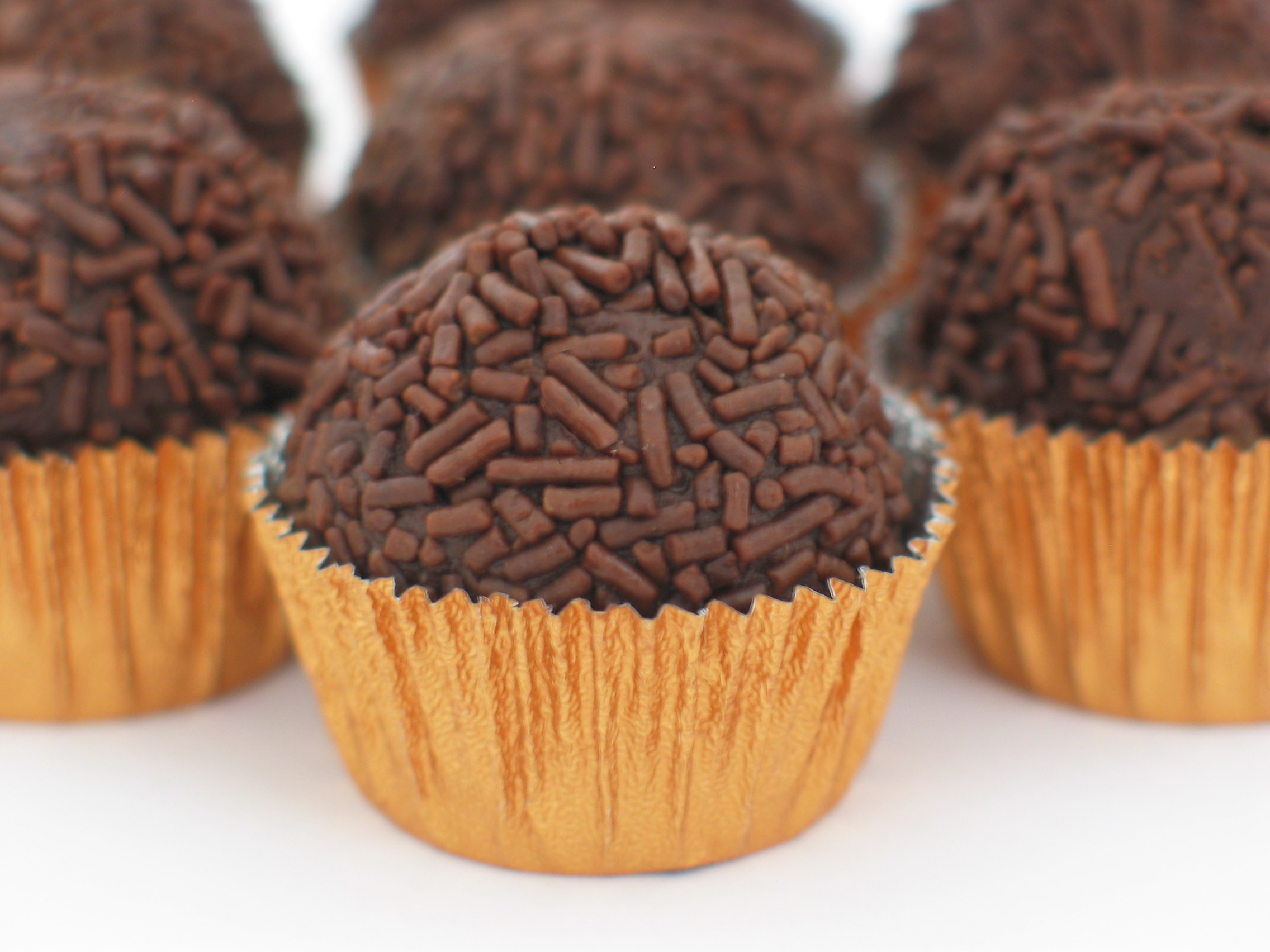
- The brigadeiro, a dessert from Brazil
- Alternative names: Negrinho (in Rio Grande do Sul)
- Type: Confectionery
- Place of origin: Brazil
- Serving temperature: Cold, chilled
- Main ingredients: Sweetened condensed milk, butter and cocoa powder

Brigadeiro (Brazilian Portuguese pronunciation: [bɾiɡaˈdejɾu]) is a traditional Brazilian dessert. The dessert was created by a confectioner, Heloísa Nabuco de Oliveira, to promote the presidential candidacy of Eduardo Gomes. The ingredients are condensed milk, cocoa powder, butter and chocolate sprinkles, which coat the outside to prevent any sticking. It can be cooked in the stove or microwave to soft-ball stage caramel.

It is a popular confection throughout the country, especially for festive events. Brigadeiros are commonly made at home, and also found in bakeries and snack shops. A brigadeiro is generally shaped into small balls covered in chocolate sprinkles and placed in a small cupcake liner. The mixture may also be served into a small container and eaten with a spoon; this is known as a brigadeiro de colher (literally, "spoon brigadeiro"). Brigadeiro can be found now in different countries as a result of Brazilian migration.

In recent years, flavor and coating variations on the traditional chocolate brigadeiros have become popular. This variation of flavors and easy manipulation of the original dessert lead into a trend of different recipes, such as cakes, tarts, ice cream, candies or even bread.

== History ==
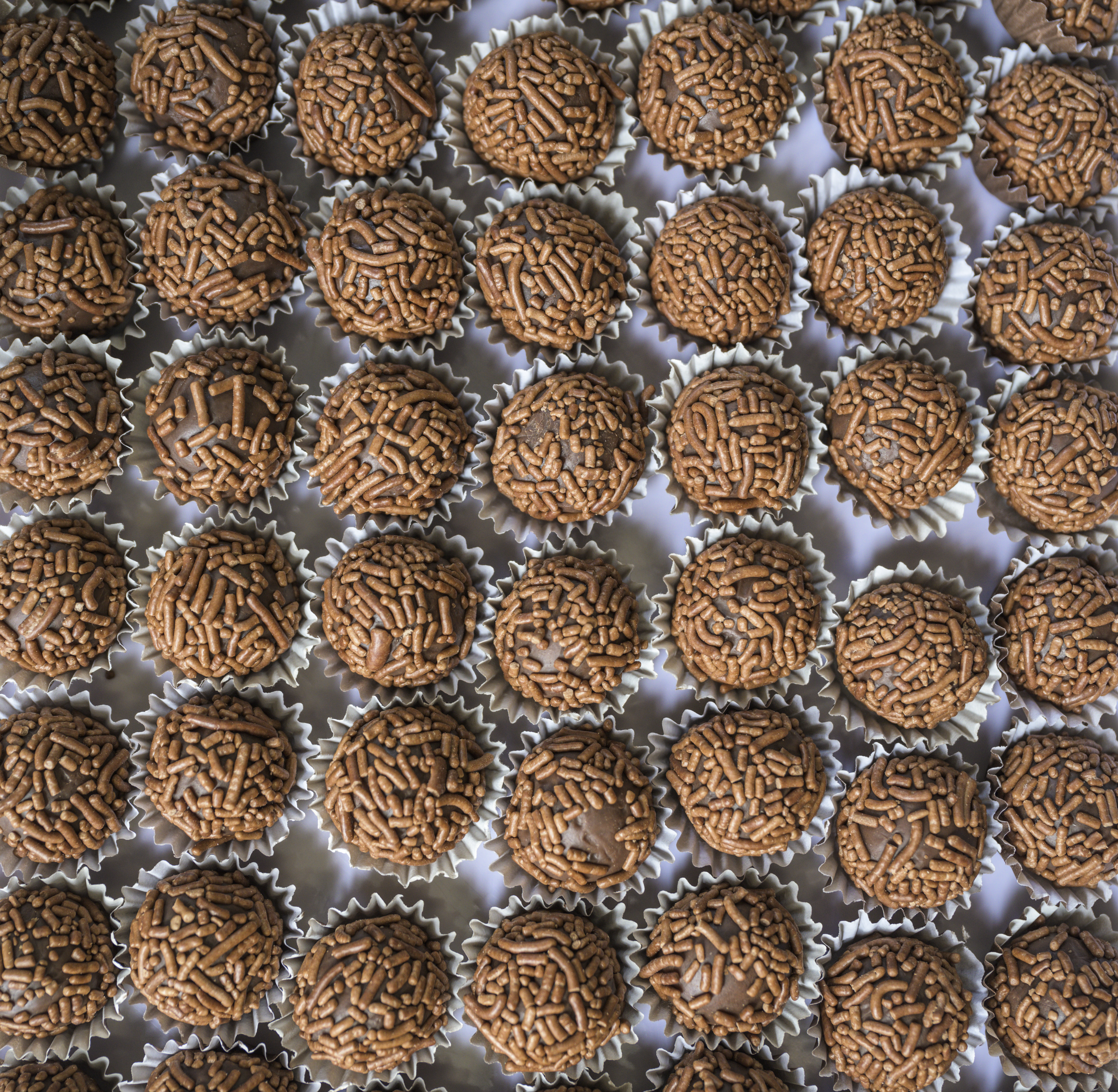

The origin of the name "brigadeiro" is linked to the presidential campaign of Brigadier Eduardo Gomes, UDN candidate for the Presidency of the Republic in 1945. Heloísa Nabuco de Oliveira, a member of a traditional carioca family who supported the brigadier's candidacy, created a new confection and named it after the candidate. The doce do brigadeiro (lit. brigadier's candy) became popular, and the name was eventually shortened to just "brigadeiro". Women at the time would sell brigadeiro in support of the presidential candidate, as it was the first national election in which women were able to vote.

Despite the campaign's popularity, Eduardo Gomes was defeated, and the election was won by then General Eurico Gaspar Dutra.

In the state of Rio Grande do Sul, brigadeiros are most commonly known as negrinhos (literally "little black ones"). One researcher traced its origins back to the 1920s, when condensed milk by Nestlé started being sold in Brazil.

== Varieties ==
There are many different versions of brigadeiros that can be made by switching ingredients. While the chocolate version is the most popular, variations range from fruity, nutty, coffee or infused treats. For example, Dois Amores (Two Loves), is a combination of dark chocolate and white chocolate. Another example is Beijinho (small kiss) which is coconut flavored brigadeiro.

== Gallery ==
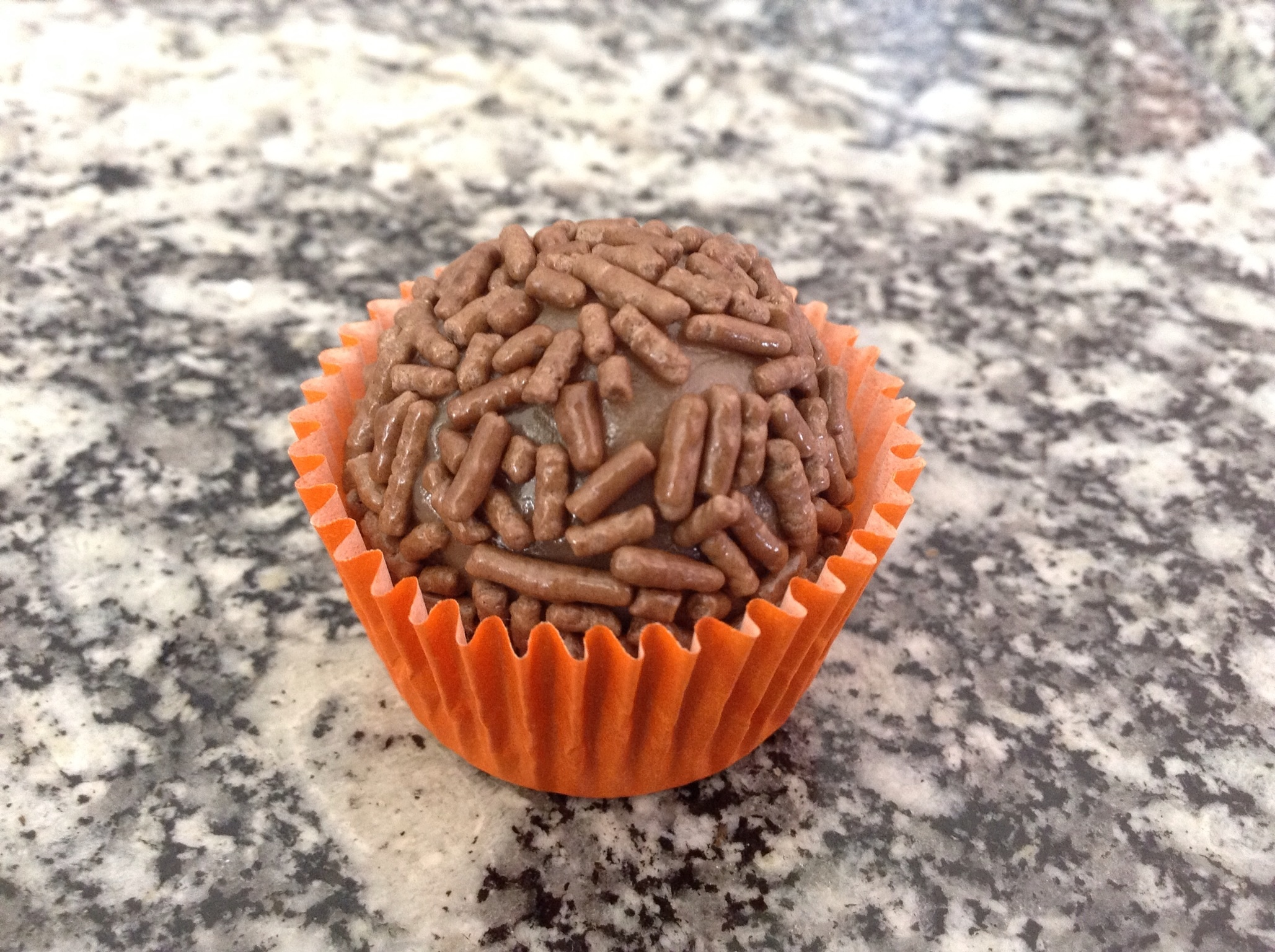
Regular chocolate brigadeiro

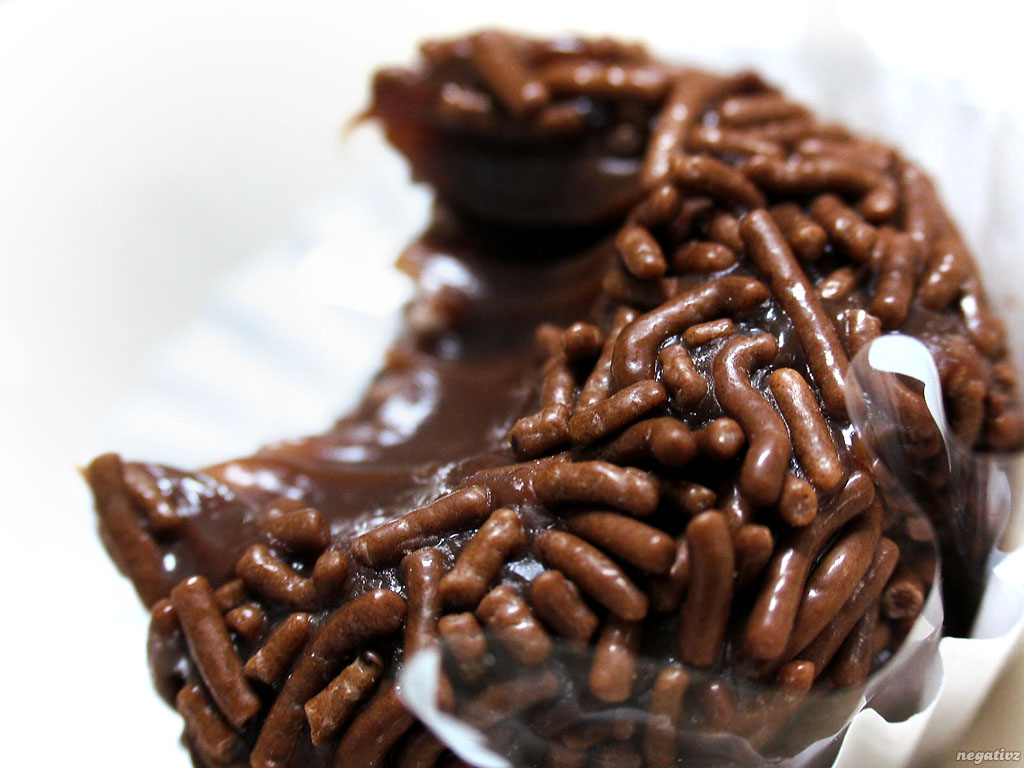
Close-up of a brigadeiro

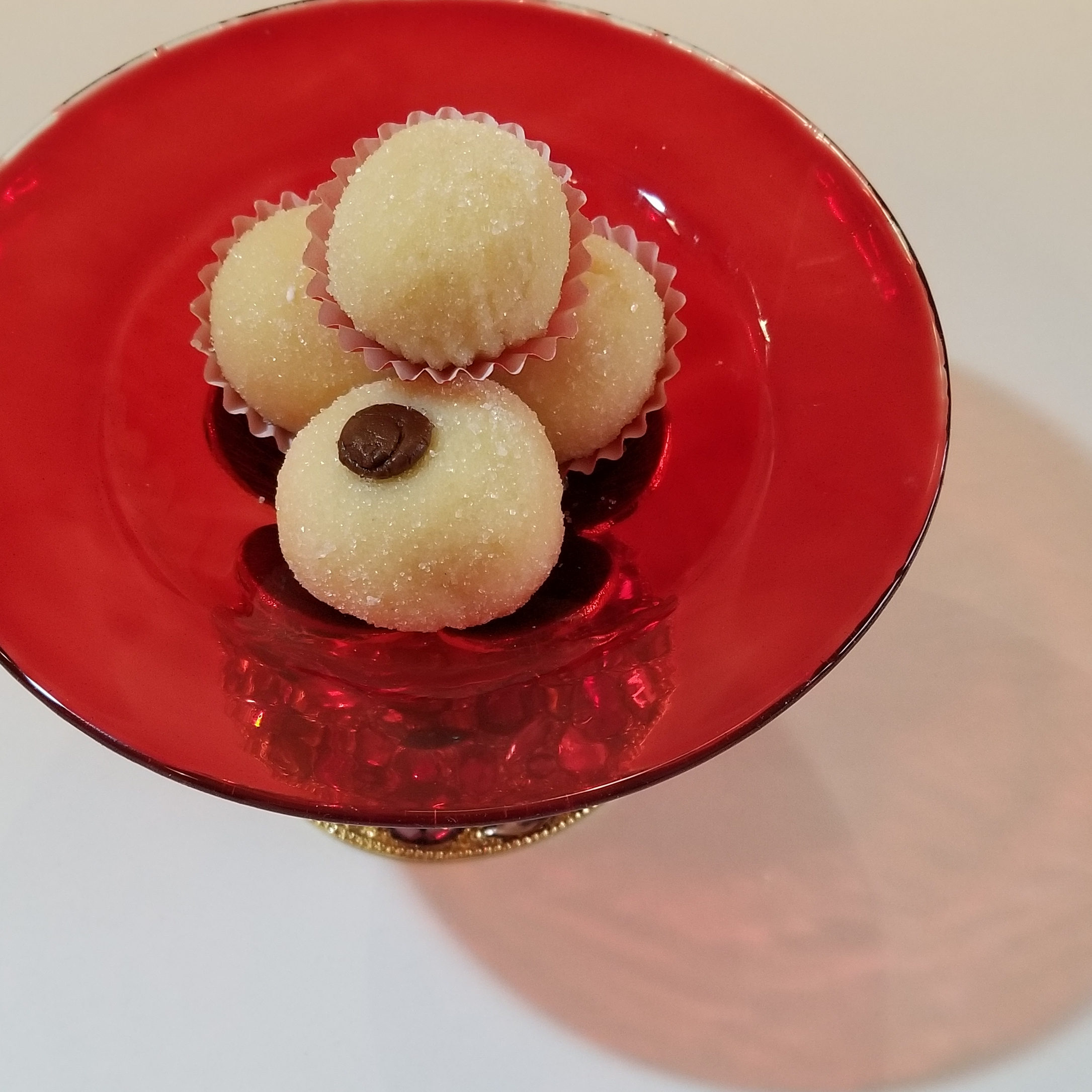
White chocolate brigadeiros

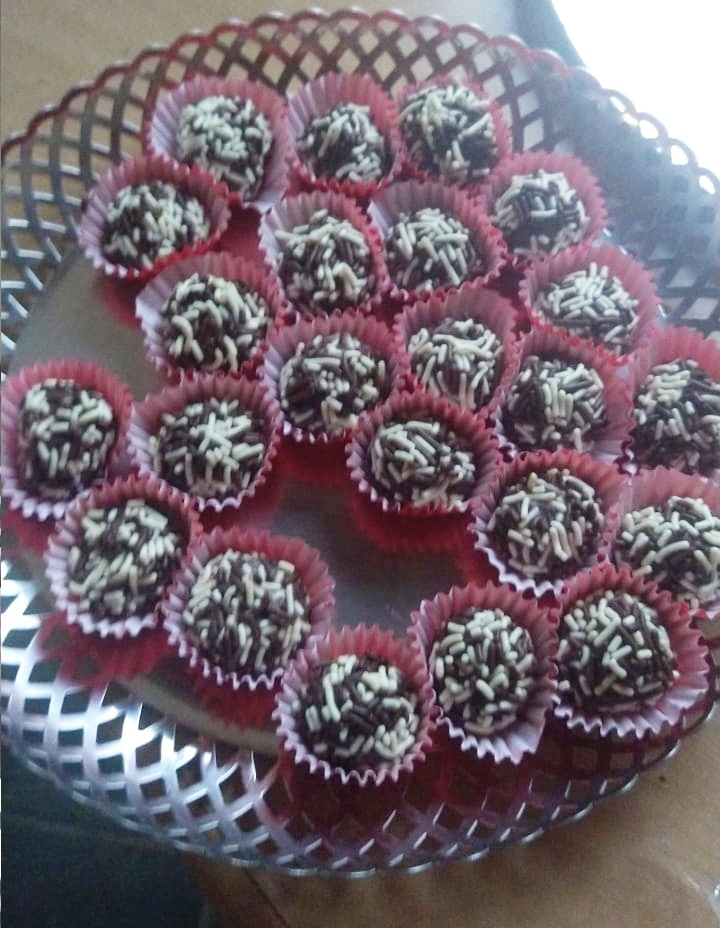
Brigadeiros with multiple differently flavored sprinkles

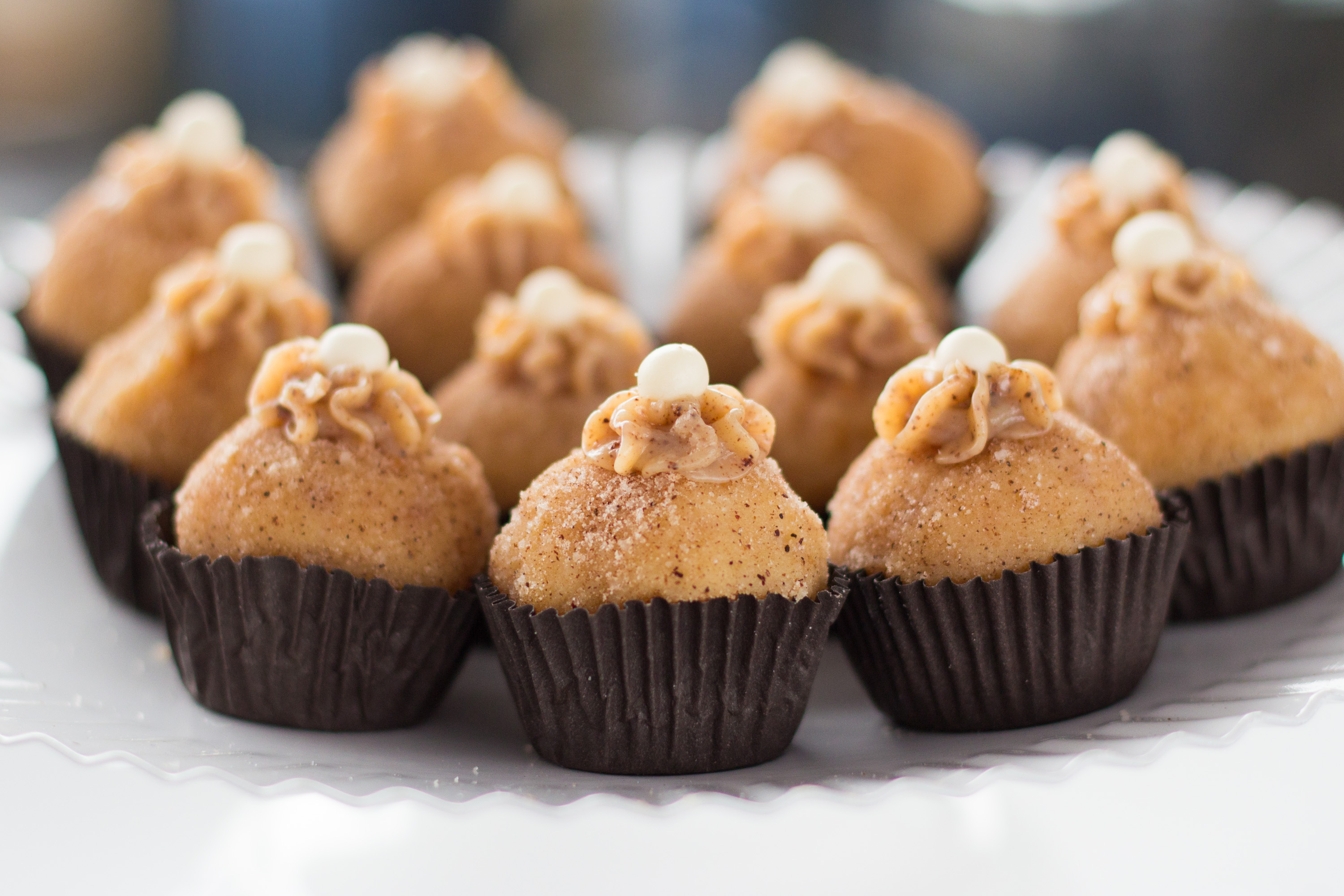
Banana brigadeiros

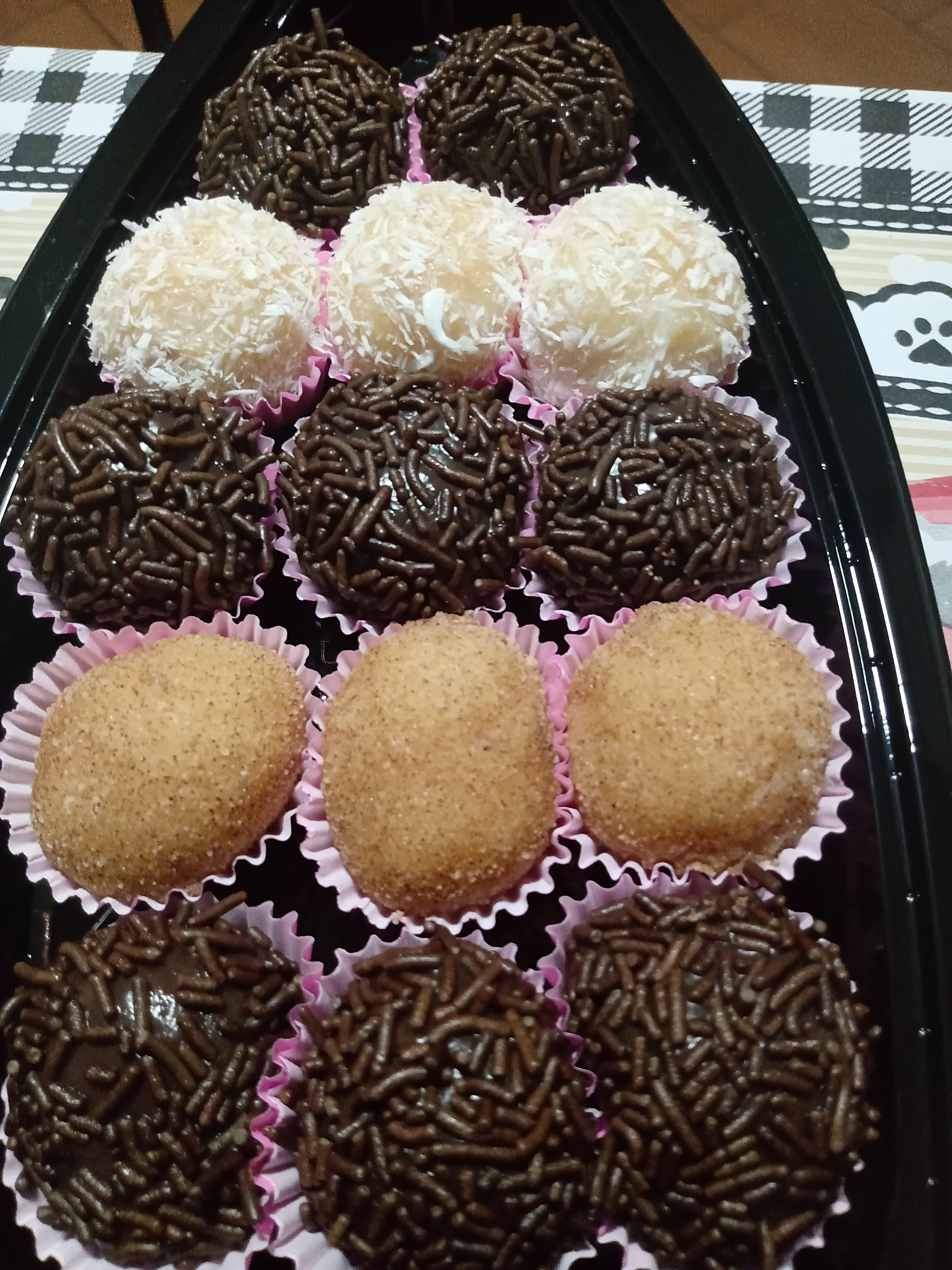
Variety of brigadeiro flavors

== See also ==
- Beijinho
- List of Brazilian sweets and desserts
- Bourbon ball
- Chokladboll
- Chocolate truffle
- Rum ball
