= Chocolate truffle =

Type of chocolate confectionery

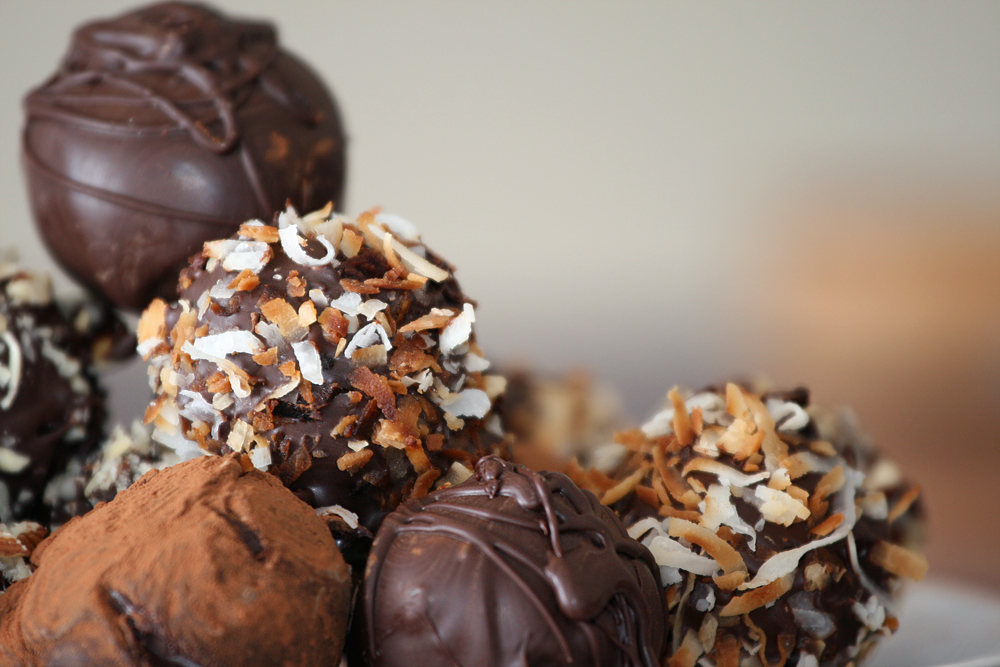
- Type: Confection
- Place of origin: France
- Main ingredients: Chocolate ganache, chocolate or cocoa powder

A chocolate truffle is a French chocolate confectionery traditionally made with a chocolate ganache center and coated in cocoa powder, coconut, or chopped nuts. A chocolate truffle is handrolled into a spherical or ball shape. The name derives from the chocolate truffle's similarity in appearance to truffles, a tuber fungus.

== Varieties ==
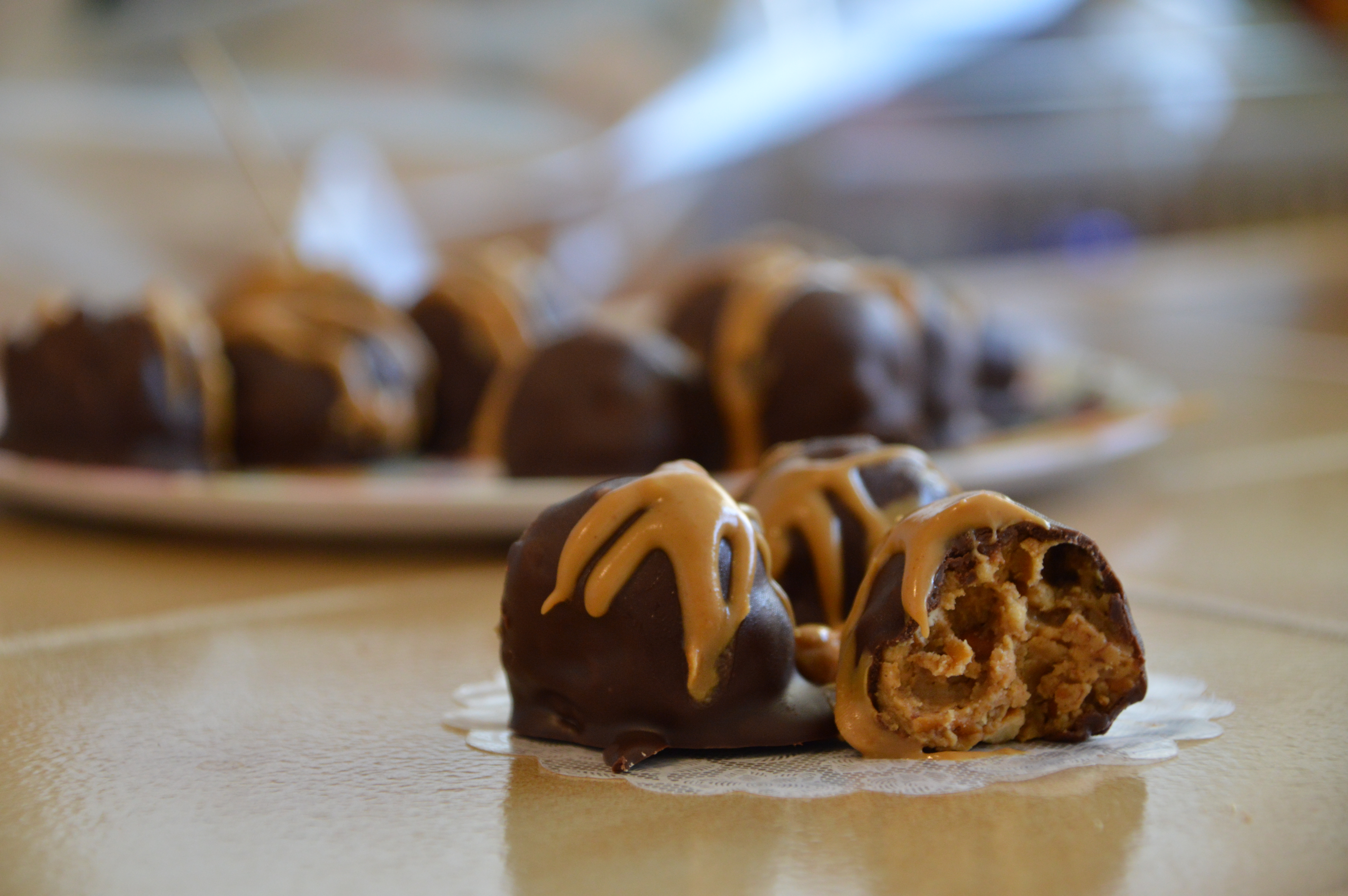
Chocolate truffles with peanut butter filling

Over the years, many varieties appeared under different names:

- The French truffle, made with fresh cream and chocolate, and then rolled in cocoa or nut powder.
- The Swiss truffle, made by combining melted chocolate into a boiling mixture of dairy cream and butter, which is poured into molds to set before sprinkling with cocoa powder. Like the French truffles, these have a very short shelf life and must be consumed within a few days of making.
- The Spanish truffle, prepared with dark chocolate, condensed milk, rum (or any preferred liqueur), and chocolate sprinkles.
- The typical European truffle, made with syrup and a base of cocoa powder, milk powder, fats, and other such ingredients to create an oil-in-water type of emulsion.
- The American truffle, a half-oval-shaped, chocolate-coated truffle, a mixture of dark or milk chocolates with butterfat, and in some cases, hardened coconut oil. Joseph Schmidt, a San Francisco chocolatier and founder of Joseph Schmidt Confections, is credited with its creation in the mid-1980s.

Other styles include:

- The Belgian truffle or praline, made with dark or milk chocolate filled with ganache, buttercream, or nut pastes.
- The Californian truffle, a larger, lumpier version of the French truffle, first made by Alice Medrich in 1973 after she tasted truffles in France. She sold these larger truffles in a charcuterie in the Gourmet Ghetto neighborhood of Berkeley; then, in 1977, she began selling them in her own store, Cocolat, which soon expanded into a chain. Medrich is largely credited for starting the American craze for truffles.

== History ==
Chocolate truffles were created in the city of Chambéry by the pastry chef Louis Dufour on Christmas Day in 1895.

In the 1980s, demand for chocolate truffles in the United States increased dramatically; before 1980 they had been very uncommon in the country. As of 2005, although consumption had declined, the confections were still well regarded.

== See also ==
- Bourbon ball
- Brigadeiro
- Chokladboll
- Rum ball
