= Oatmeal ball =

Type of confectionery popular in Sweden

Oatmeal Balls
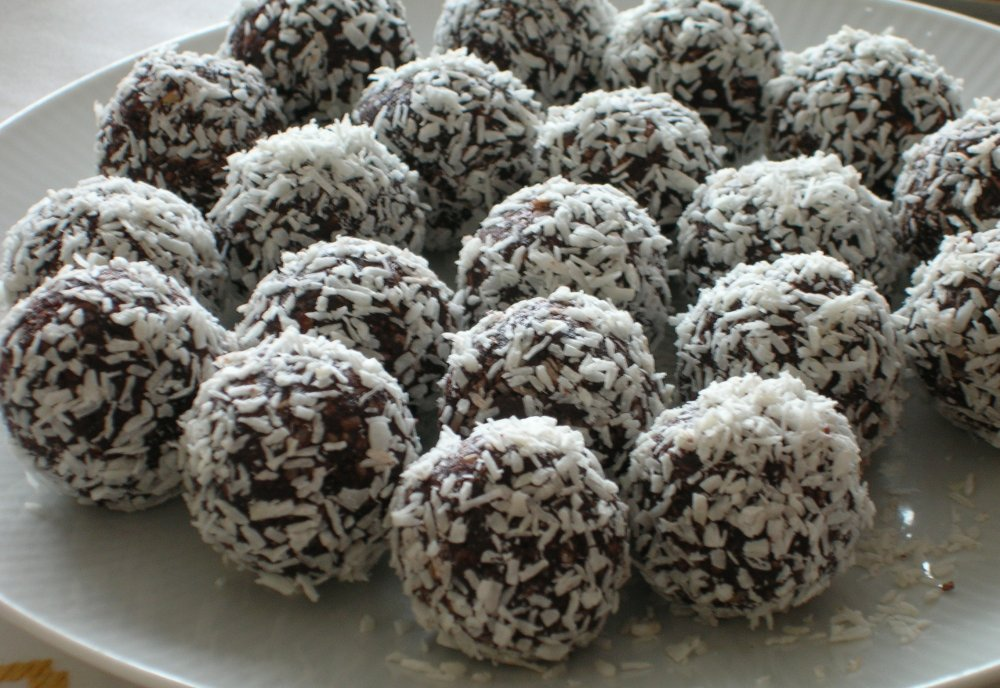
- Oatmeal balls rolled in shredded coconut
- Place of origin: Sweden
- Invented: 1943
- Main ingredients: Oatmeal, sugar, coffee, cocoa, butter

The oatmeal ball (Danish: havregrynskugle) or the chocolate ball (Swedish: chokladboll) is a type of unbaked pastry that is a popular Danish and Swedish confectionery.

Oatmeal balls consist of oatmeal, sugar, cocoa, vanilla sugar, butter, and sometimes a small amount of coffee mixed until they become a compact mass. To make them creamier and softer, some cooks add a splash of cream. The balls are molded by hand into balls slightly smaller than golf balls, then rolled in shredded coconut, pearl sugar or sprinkles. The balls can be eaten immediately, but are usually chilled in a refrigerator before consumption.

Because of the simple, non-bake recipe, oatmeal balls they are a popular treat at children's parties.

Variations on the oatmeal ball are popular in other countries too. In Israel, Petit Beurre crumbs take the place of the oatmeal, and the candy is called Kadur Shokolad (Hebrew: כדור שוקולד, lit. 'chocolate ball'). Popular in Austria, especially around Christmastime, is the Rumkugel (plural Rumkugeln), which contains the same ingredients as oatmeal balls but adds a small amount of rum to the mix. In the Canadian province of Newfoundland and Labrador, the snowball is a popular Christmas treat, which uses the same ingredients with the addition of evaporated milk.

== History ==
The oatmeal ball was most likely invented during World War II, when, because of rationing, there was a limited supply of wheat flour, which caused a search for substitutes. In 1943, the Danish Nationaltidende published a small booklet for housewives called Ingenuity in a time of crisis (Danish: Opfindsomhed i en krisetid) containing the recipe for havregrynskugle. There is also a classified ad for a konditorei product with the name negerbollar from 1918 in the Swedish newspaper Svenska Dagbladet.

== Names in Swedish ==
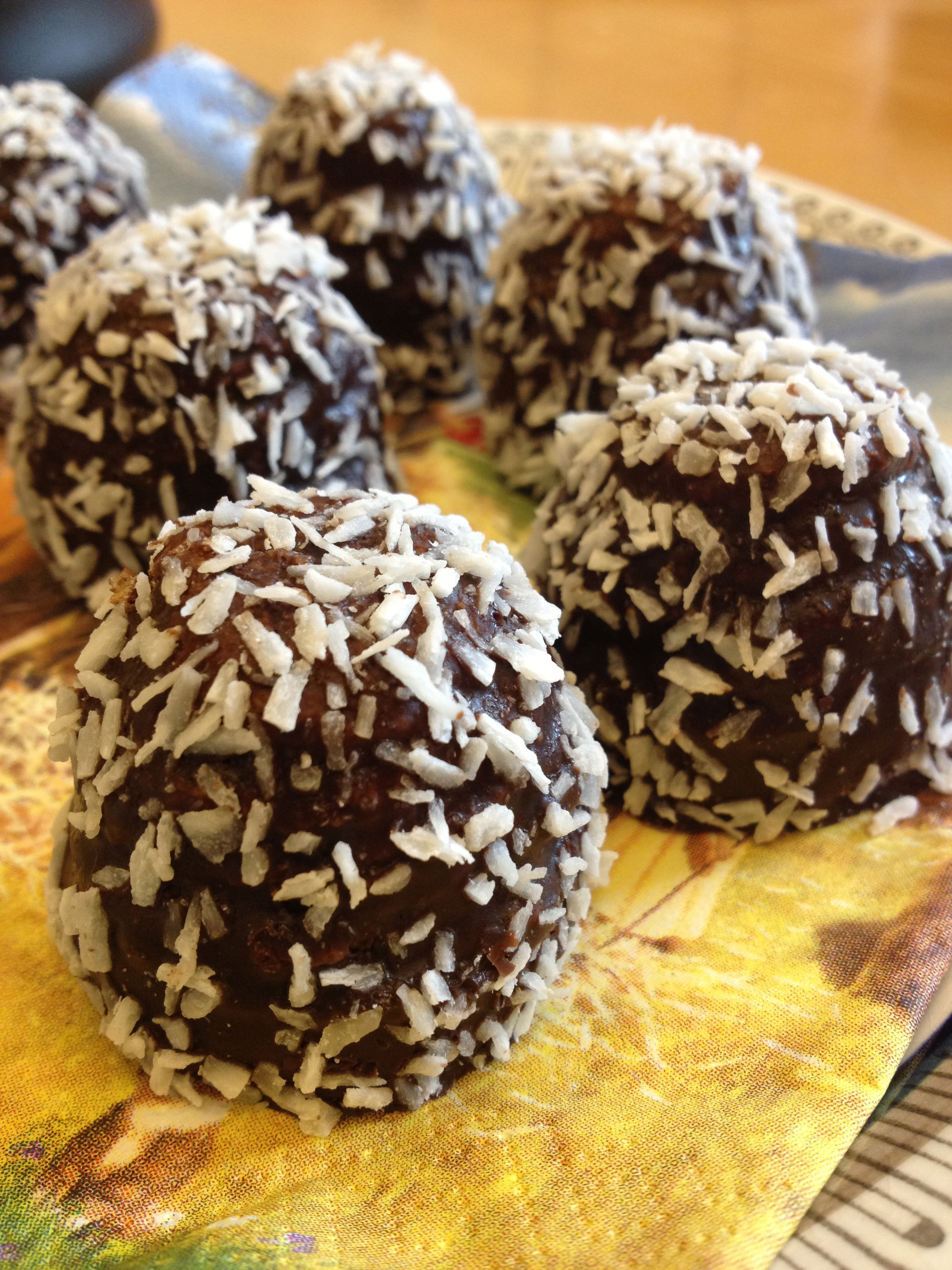
Close-up view of chokladboll

One traditional name for the pastry in Swedish is negerboll ("negro ball"). Due to possible racist connotations, this name has fallen out of favor in recent decades, with chokladboll (chocolate ball) now being the most commonly used name. When made with shredded coconut, it is also known as kokosboll (coconut ball).

The appropriateness of negerboll as the name of the pastry has been the subject of media debate, intensified by neger now generally being considered an ethnic slur, having undergone a similar change in tone to English Negro. Chokladboll was first added to the Swedish Academy's spelling dictionary Svenska Akademiens ordlista in 2006, with only negerboll being listed prior. In the 13th (2006) edition, the pastry can be found under both names, with a comment that chokladboll is the recommended term. In the 14th edition (2015) negerboll was removed.

In mid-2003, a bakery owner from Sjöbo was reported to the Swedish Ombudsman against Ethnic Discrimination for using the word negerboll on a sign in her bakery shop. However, the case was dismissed since the person reporting it did not consider herself personally insulted.

Note that the Danish word negerbolle is a similarly dated term for a similar but different confection, namely the flødebolle.

== See also ==
- Bourbon ball
- Brigadeiro
- Bánh bò
- Chocolate truffle
- Rum ball
- Lo mai chi
- Kozhukkatta
- Cocada
- Coconut sugar
- Gulha
- Lamington
