= Suikerbrood =

Yeast-based bread

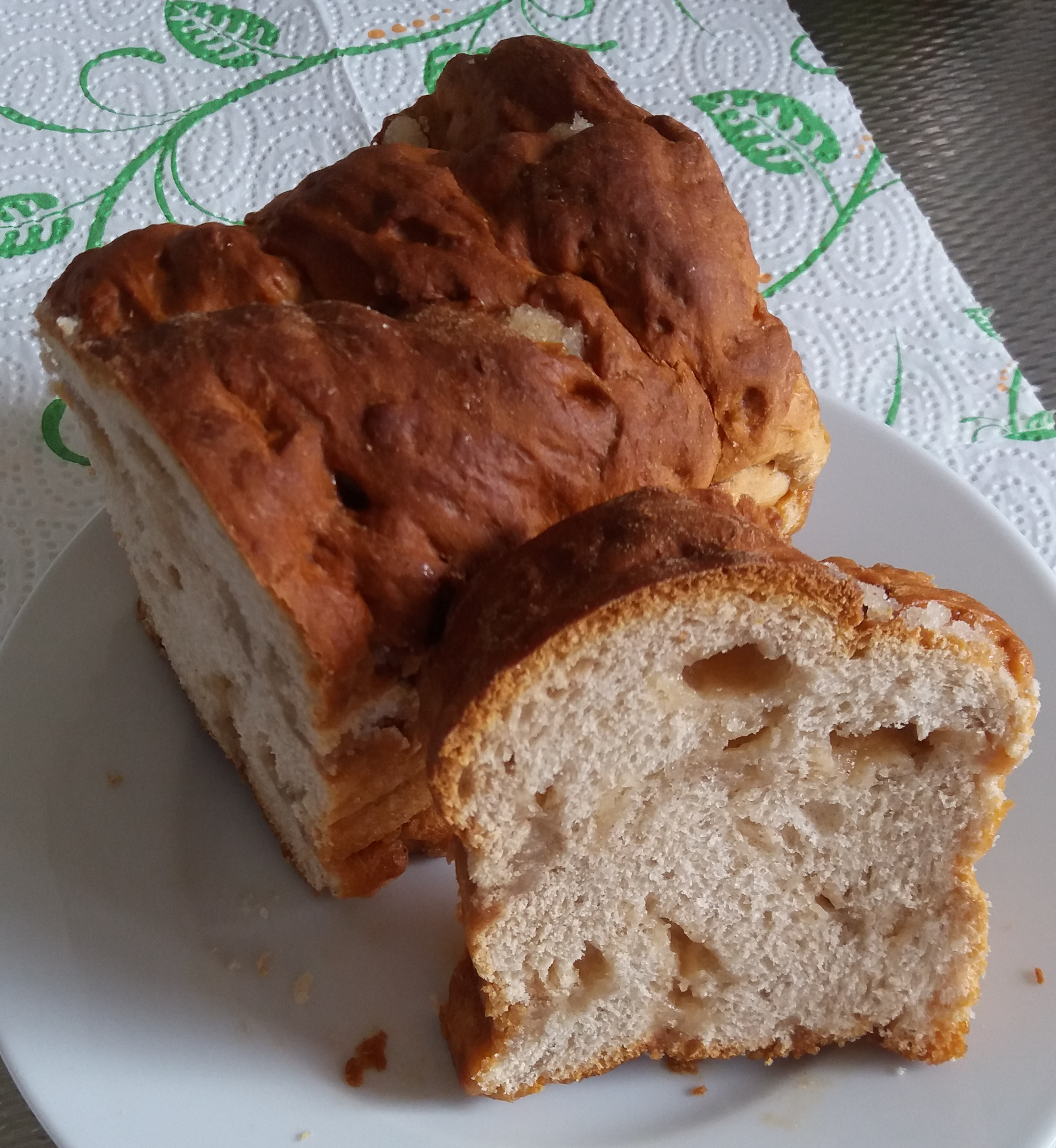
- Type: Sweet bread
- Main ingredients: Yeast-based bread, sugar, cinnamon

Suikerbrood (Dutch: [ˈsœykərˌbroːt]; West Frisian: sûkerbôle; both lit. 'sugar bread'; French: craquelin [kʁaklɛ̃]) is a yeast-based bread. It is a Frisian luxury version of white bread, with large lumps of sugar mixed in with the dough. It contains a significant amount of sugar, traditionally added as nib sugar, though sometimes sugar cubes are used. While eaten throughout the Netherlands and Belgium, it is especially associated with Friesland. Suikerbrood is usually flavored with cinnamon and sometimes with ginger. Traditionally, a suikerbrood is given as a present to the parents after a baby's birth.
