= Corone (bread) =

Japanese sweet bread

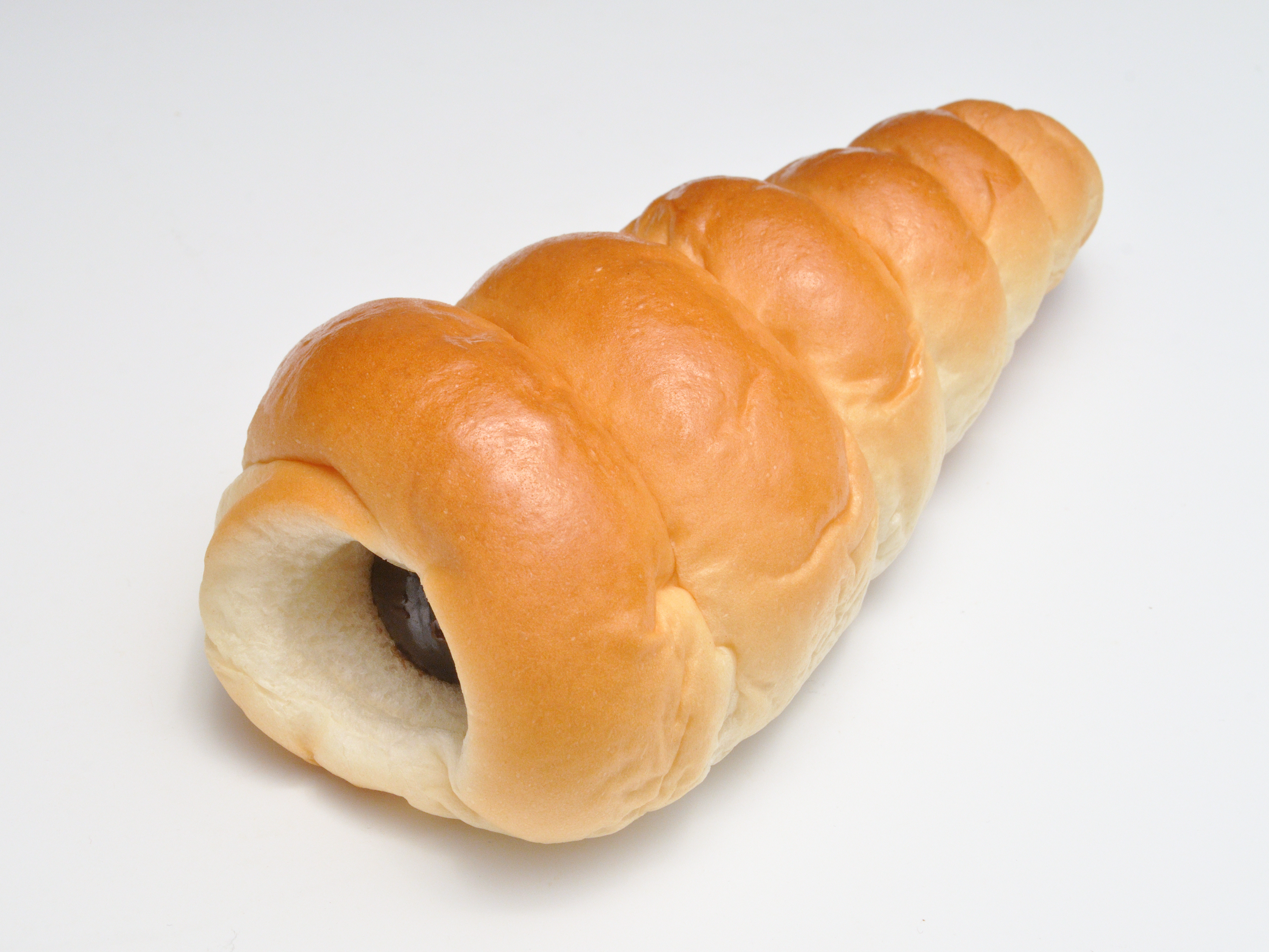
- Choco corone
- Alternative names: Korone; cornet; coronet
- Type: Sweet bread
- Place of origin: Japan
- Associated cuisine: Japanese cuisine
- Invented: Meiji era
- Main ingredients: Dough; cream
- Ingredients generally used: Chocolate cream; custard cream
- Similar dishes: Cornetto; cuerno de crema

Corone (Japanese: コロネ or コルネ; lit. 'Coronet') is a sweet bread developed in Japan. The bread is made by wrapping dough around a conch-shaped metal tube, baking it, and then filling it with cream. It is called choco corone (Japanese: チョココロネ; lit. 'chocolate corone') when filled with chocolate cream, and cream corone (Japanese: クリームコロネ; lit. 'cream corone') when filled with custard cream.

The word "corone" is thought to come from either a French word which refers to horn, or an English word which refers to a brass instrument. It is said to have existed during the Meiji era, but it is unknown who invented it.

== Features ==
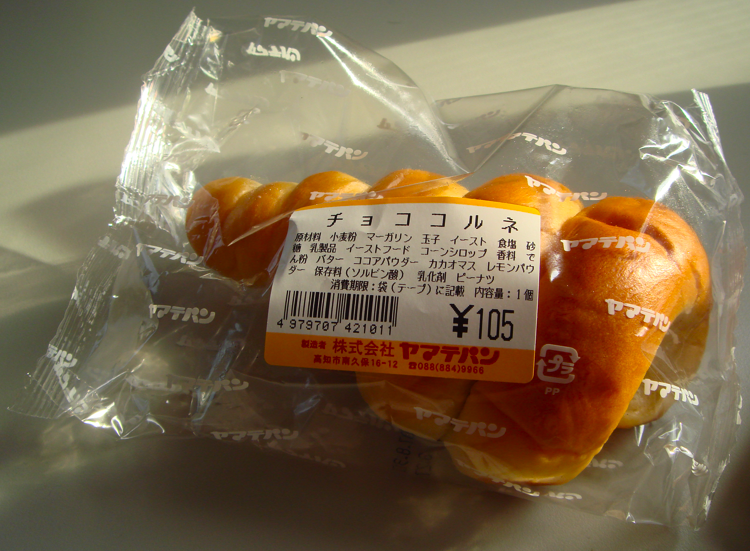
Choco corone (チョココロネ) is often called "チョココルネ"

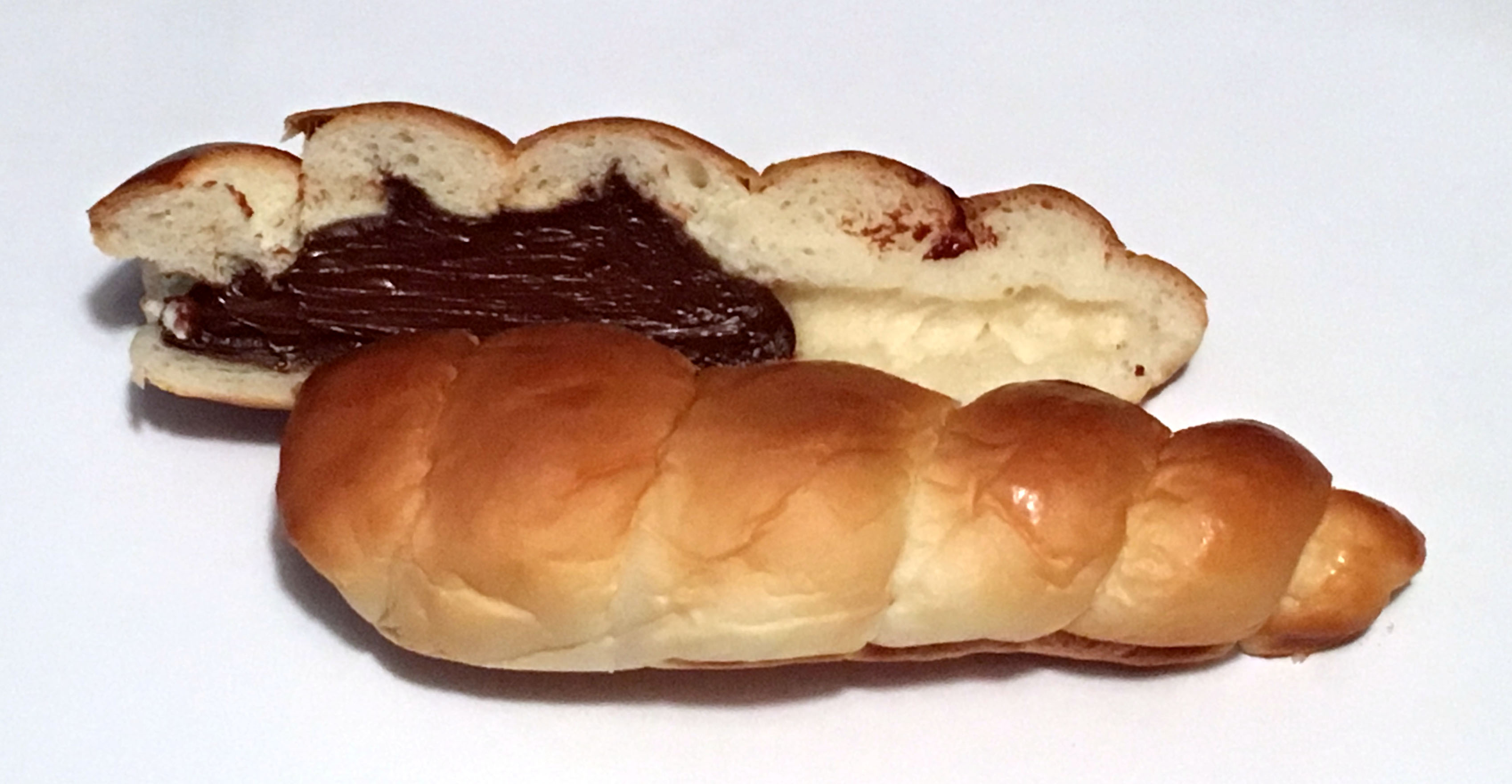
Cross section of a Kobeya Baking's corone

Unlike Cream-pan or Chocolate-pan, which are baked after filling the dough with cream, corone is baked before filling with cream, to keep the filling moist.

Unlike the Western cooking techniques of kneading cream into bread or putting it on top of the dough, creating a cavity in the bread and filling it with cream is said to be a uniquely Japanese cooking techniques, and the techniques are accepted from manjū.。

== Similar breads ==
Cornetto is an Italian bread made with a croissant-like bread filled with chocolate cream. Cuerno de crema is a hispanophone bread made with a conch-shaped dough filled with a stuffing.

== Derived foods ==
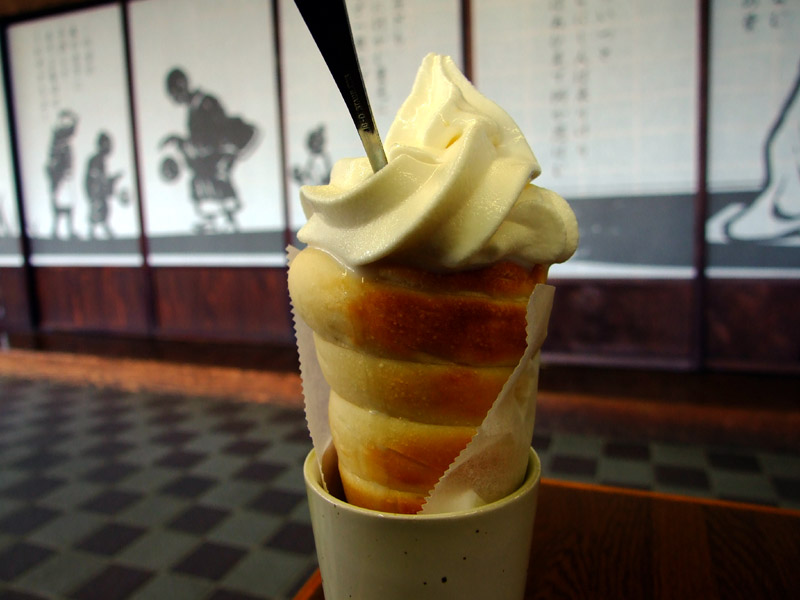
an example of corone soft

Soft serve in which the ice cream cone part is replaced with a corone is called ice corone (Japanese: アイスコルネット; lit. 'ice cream corone') or corone soft (Japanese: コロネソフト; lit. 'corone soft serve'). However, ice corone is made with a corone-shaped age-pan, and corone soft may also be made with a corone-shaped croissant.

== See also ==
- Ice cornet
- Cornetto (pastry)
- Cream horn
