= Cornetto (pastry) =

Italian pastry

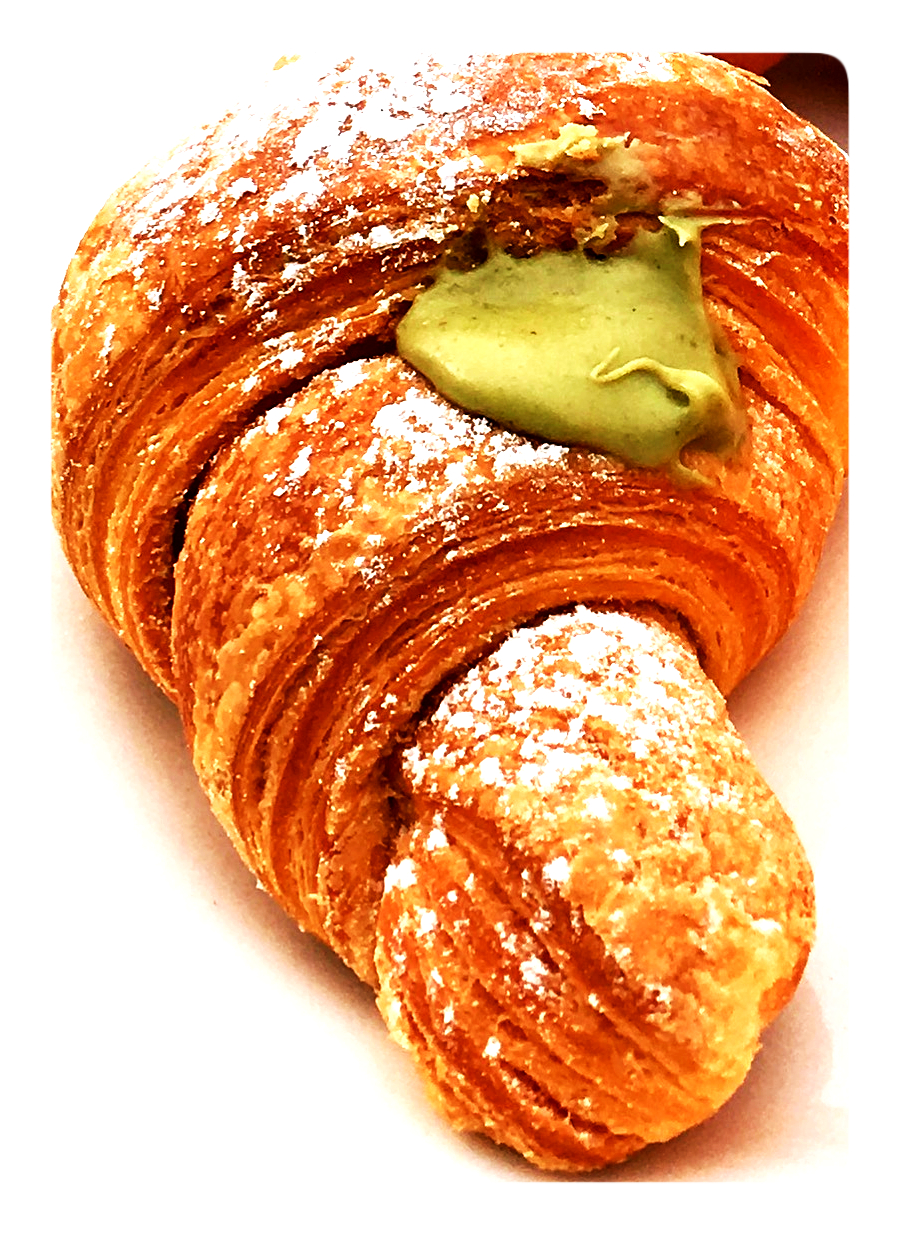
- Type: Sweet
- Place of origin: Italy
- Main ingredients: Yeasted dough
- Variations: Many types of fillings

Cornetto (Italian: [korˈnetto]; meaning 'little horn') is historically the Italian name of a product similar to the Austrian kipferl, although today it is an interchangeable name for the French croissant.

The main ingredients of a cornetto are pastry dough, eggs, butter, water, and sugar. Egg yolk is brushed on the surface of the cornetto to obtain a golden color during baking.

The cornetto vuoto (lit. 'empty cornetto') is commonly accompanied by various fillings, including crema pasticciera (custard), apricot jam or chocolate cream, and covered with powdered sugar or ground nuts. A cornetto with an espresso or cappuccino at a coffee bar is considered to be the most common breakfast in Italy.

The name cornetto is common in southern and central Italy, while it is called "brioche" in the north.

== History ==
The recipe of kipferl became popular in Italy, and more specifically in Veneto, after 1683, thanks to the intense commercial relations between the Republic of Venice and Vienna. In France, it was not until the 1770 marriage between the Austrian Marie Antoinette and the future King Louis XVI that the pastry gained popularity there. Its recipe was modified by the pastry chefs, who replaced the brioche dough for a leavened puff pastry and called it "croissant". French chef Sylvain Claudius Goy records a yeast-leavened laminated croissant in his 1915 book La Cuisine Anglo-Americaine. The croissant became popular in France mainly in the 20th century.

== See also ==
Media related to Cornetto at Wikimedia Commons

- List of Italian desserts and pastries
- Croissant
- Corone (bread)
