= Kifli =

Crescent-shaped bread roll

Kipferl
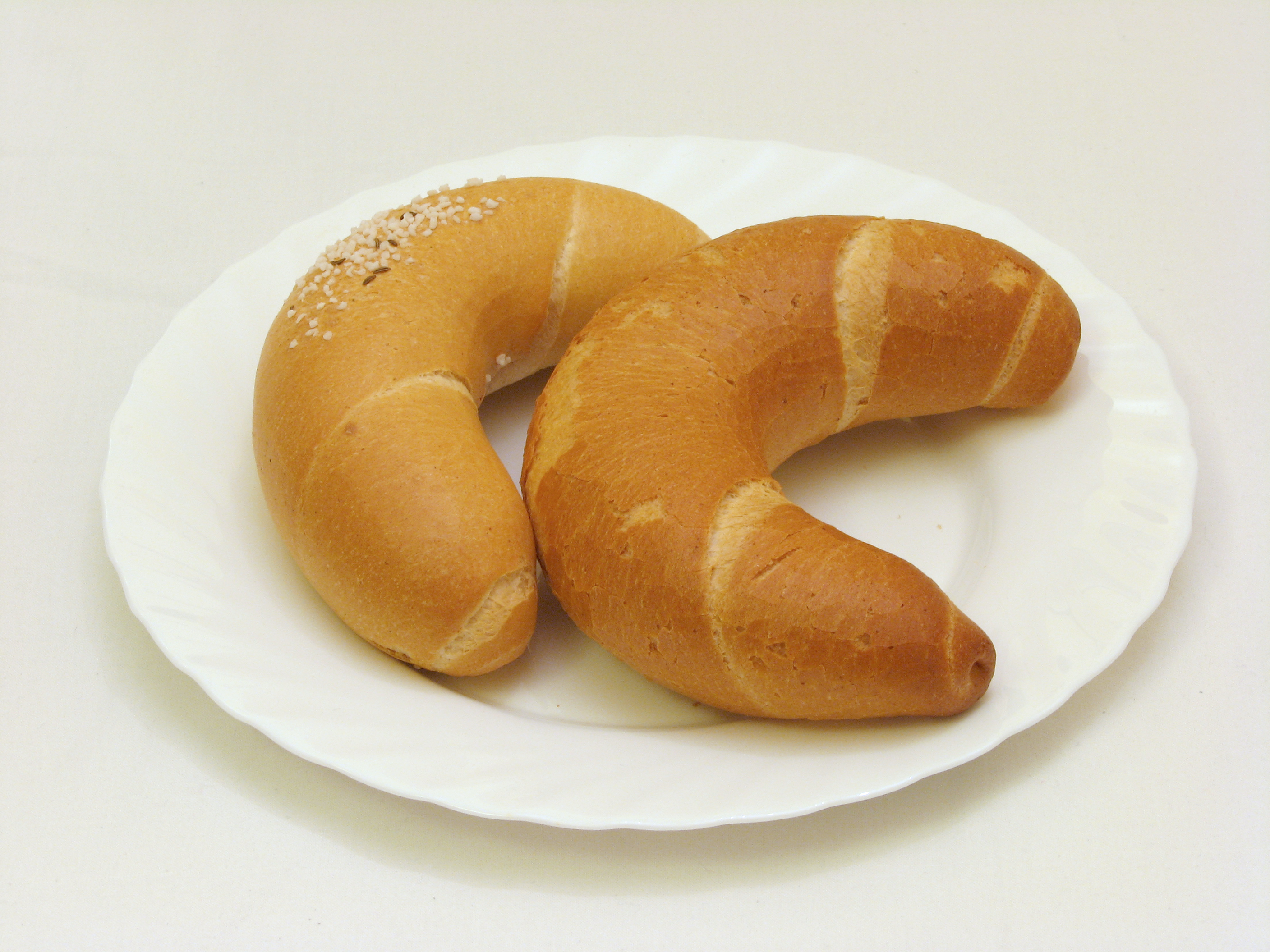
- Two Kipferl, the left one salted
- Type: Bread roll
- Course: Breakfast, coffee break
- Region or state: Europe
- Serving temperature: Warm or room temperature
- Main ingredients: Wheat flour

Kipferl, kifli, kiflice, kifle or cornuri is a traditional yeast-based bread roll, rolled and formed into a crescent-shape before baking.

It is a common type of bread roll throughout much of central Europe and nearby countries, and is known by several names. It is thought to be the inspiration for the French croissant, which has a very similar shape, though is made with a different type of dough.

In Germany and Austria, unused kipfel are used to make a sweet bread pudding called Kipfelkoch.

== Names ==
The roll is called:

- Kipferl in Austrian German
  - küpfel or a Meidlinger roll in Vienna
- kipfl in German speaking South Tyrol Italy
- kifli in Hungarian
- kifla / кифла (pl. kifle / кифле or kiflice / кифлице) in Bosnian, Croatian, and Serbian
- кифла [kifla] in Bulgarian
- кифла [kifla] in Macedonian
- kifle in Albanian
- giffel in Danish and Swedish
- rogal or rogalik (little horn) in Polish
- rohlík in Czech
- rožok in Slovak
- рогалик [rogalik] in Russian
- рогалик [rohalyk] in Ukrainian
- rogljiček or kifelc in Slovene
- corn in Romanian
- horn (horn) in Norwegian
- Hörnchen (little horn) in German

In Old High German, Kipfa means "carriage stanchion" and refers to the stanchions or "horns" of a cart. In the 13th century, that usage referred to a bread shape of pagan origin.

The Czech, Slovak, Polish, Slovenian, Ukrainian, and Russian names derive as diminutives from the Slavic word rogal or rohel ("horned") which in turn derives from "rog/roh" ("horn/protrusion"). Some other languages use a simple translation ("horn", "cornulet").

The similarity between the words "rohalyk" or "rohlík" and the English word "roll" is coincidental; the words are not related by origin. The Slavic root "rog" can be hypothetically associated with the German verb "ragen" ("to protrude").

== Background ==
Kipferl is a traditional yeasted bread rolled into a crescent shape. The Austrian kipferl is a small wheat roll with pointed ends. The 17th-century Austrian monk Abraham a Sancta Clara described the roll as crescent-shaped, writing "the moon in the first quarter shines like a kipfl", and noted there were Kipferl in various forms: "vil lange, kurze, krumpe und gerade kipfel" ("many long, short, crooked and straight kipfel").

Breads or pastries in the shape of a crescent moon are believed to have been served in ancient times as offerings to the goddess of the moon, Selene. The shape is also reminiscent of horns; both are associated with ancient symbolism and considered the oldest surviving pastry shape.

A list of foods eaten in a 10th-century convent includes panis lunatis, described as a small, crescent-shaped roll often eaten during fasts.

The Kipferl has been documented in Austria to at least 1227 when they were recorded in Babenberg-ruled Vienna as chipfen:

dô brâchten im die pecken

chipfen und weiʒe flecken,

weiʒer dann ein hermelein.

— Jans der Enikel

In Austria, the Kipferl is formally recognized by the government as a traditional food. According to the Austrian Ministry of Agriculture, Regions and Tourism, Kipferl were probably a traditional monastery roll baked for Easter. They are described as crescent-shaped rolls made of yeast wheat dough in a variety of shapes and as being popular for coffee breaks and breakfasts, particularly in Vienna.

The Kipferl likely inspired the similarly shaped French croissant, which is made from a viennoiserie.

=== Origin myths ===
A common culinary myth claims that the Kipferl was invented in Vienna after or during the siege of the city by Ottoman Turks. This may be in error. The rumor may have changed over time, from a story that the bakers made Kipferl in honor of the victory, which tends to point to a similar story about the victory in Buda.

Another story claims when Christian forces freed Buda from Ottoman occupation in 1686, the bakers of the town celebrated the victory the next day by selling freshly baked bread rolls made into a crescent shape. This, however, raises the question of why would the bakers make a crescent shape (a Muslim symbol) instead of a Christian one. One possible explanation is the fact that the survivors within Vienna would then have consumed their enemy's symbol.

== Preparation ==
Traditionally, Kipferl are made by cutting sheets of soft yeast dough into triangular wedges, rolling them into crescent shapes, and baking them. Unlike the French croissant (crescent), Kipferl is made from a plain, bread-like dough and is more akin to a roll than to pastry. Kipferl is also thinner and longer than the croissant. Kipferl are made in various sizes; some of them weigh as much as a small bread loaf.

In commercial preparation, the dough is mixed, cut into small pieces, and fed into a machine that flattens and rolls it.

== Varieties ==
=== Regular ===
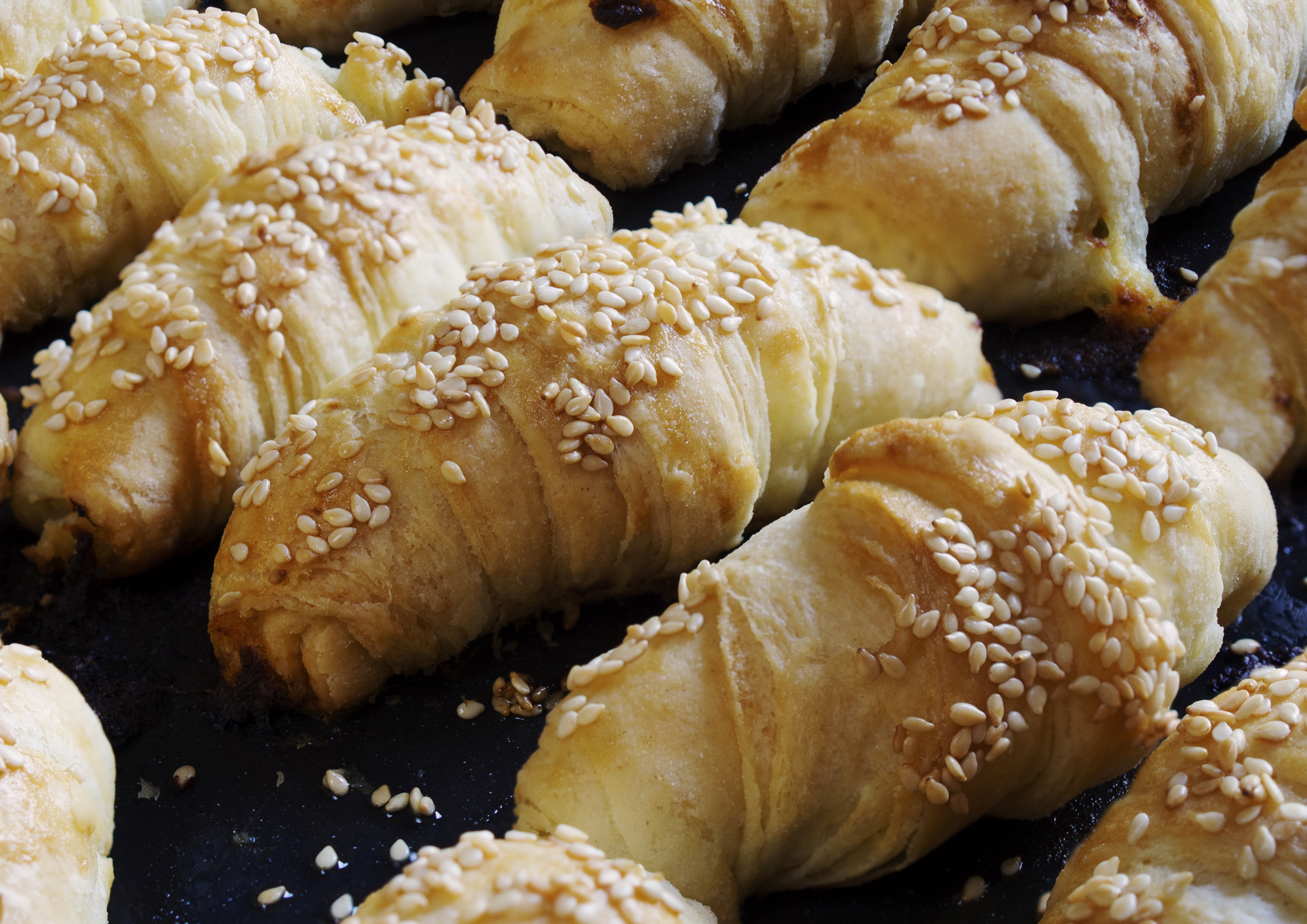
In Serbia and North Macedonia, Kipferl are sometimes made with cheese and sesame.

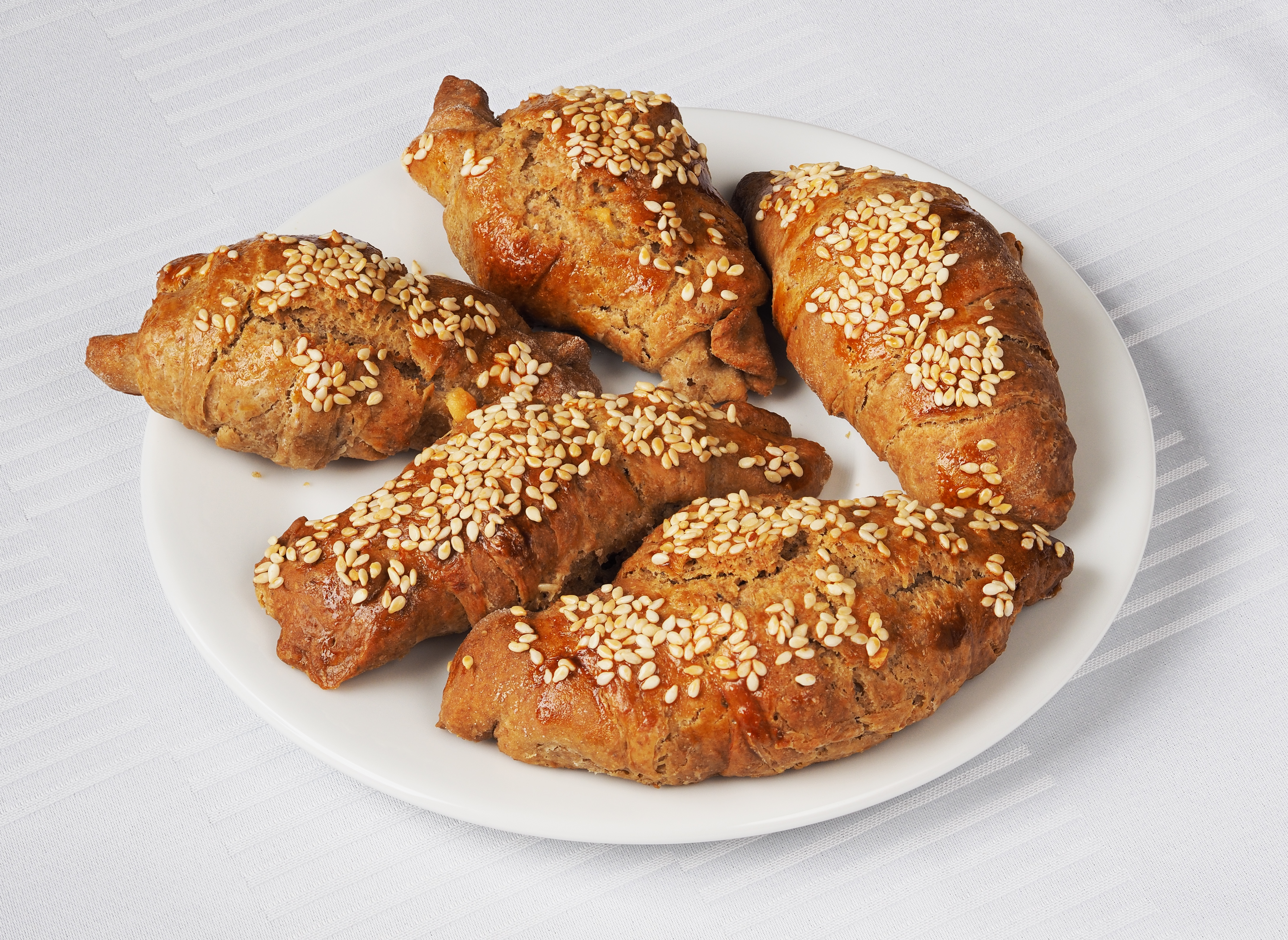
Homemade spelt kiflice, filled with sheep cheese and topped with sesame seeds, made for Serbian Christmas (January 7)

When they come out of the oven, the rolls can be left plain or brushed with water to give them a shiny finish. They can be given an egg wash and sprinkled with either poppy seeds or caraway seeds mixed with coarse salt. The latter variety is often made into a straight shape rather than a crescent. Kipferl is eaten like bread or rolls; it is usually made into a sandwich, sometimes plain or with butter like a fresh baguette. Often, especially for breakfast, the topping is jam or honey. They may also be used for dunking.

=== Fine ===
This is the same as the regular style, but the dough may contain butter or other shortening, as well as milk. It is sweeter than the regular variety and is well-suited for eating with jam or honey. It is commonly eaten for breakfast with coffee, hot chocolate, or milk. It might also be an accompaniment for drinks like Doogh and Kumis.

=== Sweet ===
There are a couple of sweet rolls named "Kipferl" to describe their shape; they are eaten at the end of a meal or with an afternoon drink; these are not Kipferl, which when used on its own, always means the regular or fine varieties. In German, these are differentiated with a different spelling: Kipferl compared to Kipfel for the yeast bread.

- Vanillekipferl is a small, very short soft cookie made from a dough of ground nuts instead of flour. It is originally made with walnuts, but almonds are more often used outside of Hungary. Once baked, they are rolled in vanilla-flavored confectioners' sugar then allowed to cool.
- Bratislavský rožok/bratislavské rožky, diós kifli, mákos kifli, also known as Pozsonyi kifli and in German as Preßburger Kipfel, are crescent-shaped, sweet, leavened pastries filled with a sweet walnut or poppy paste. Under the name Bratislavský rožok / Pozsonyi kiflia, they are registered as Traditional Speciality Guaranteed products in the EU and the UK. They are a variety of beigli, very similar in flavor but different in shape and size.
- Lupáčik (Slovak pronunciation: ['lupaːtʂik]) or makovka (Slovak pronunciation: ['makouka]), incorrectly presented as lúpačka, (Slovak pronunciation: ['luːpatʂka]) is a sweet pastry made of fatty dough, often decorated with poppy seeds.

== Gallery ==
Kifli of various cuisines

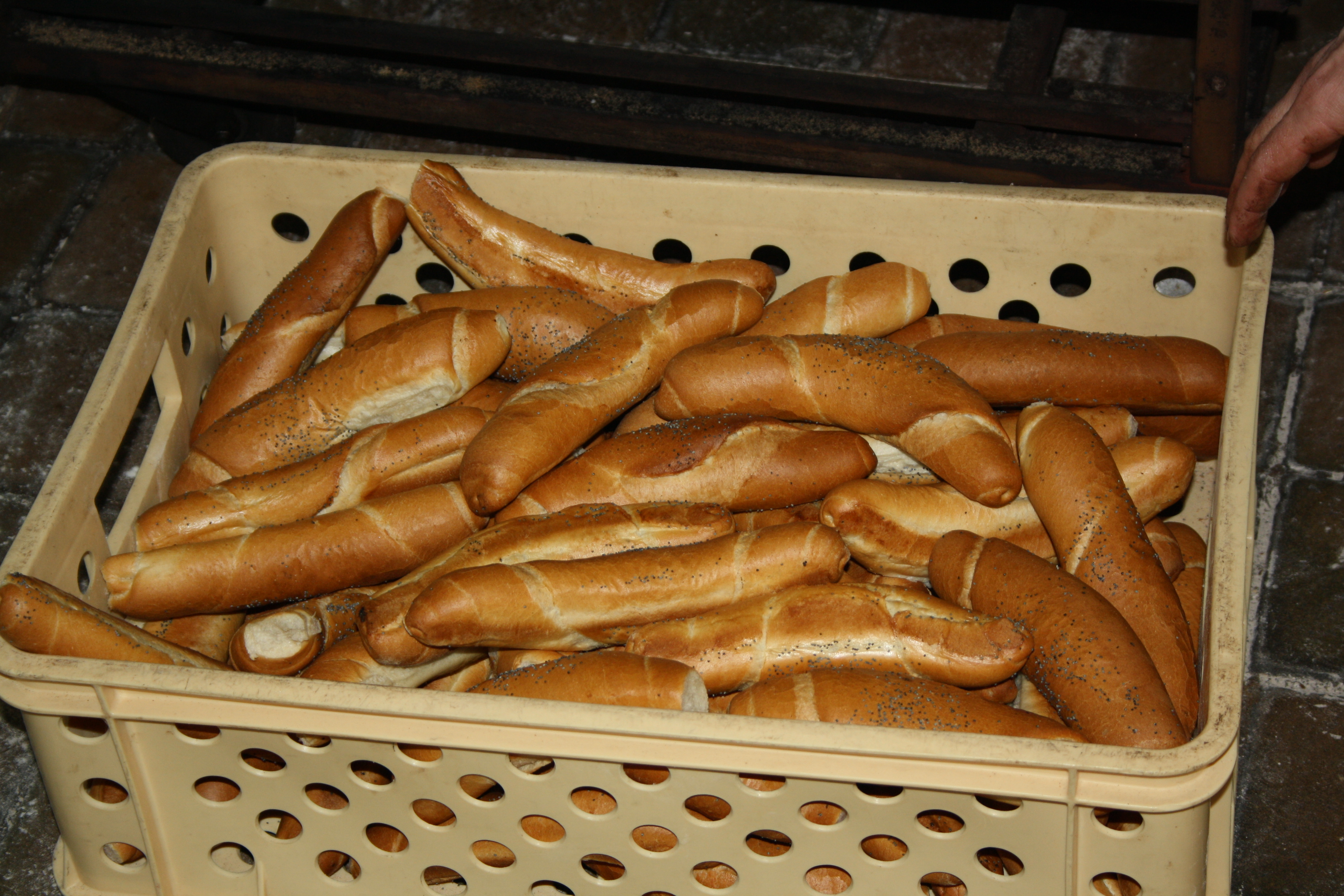
Rohlík

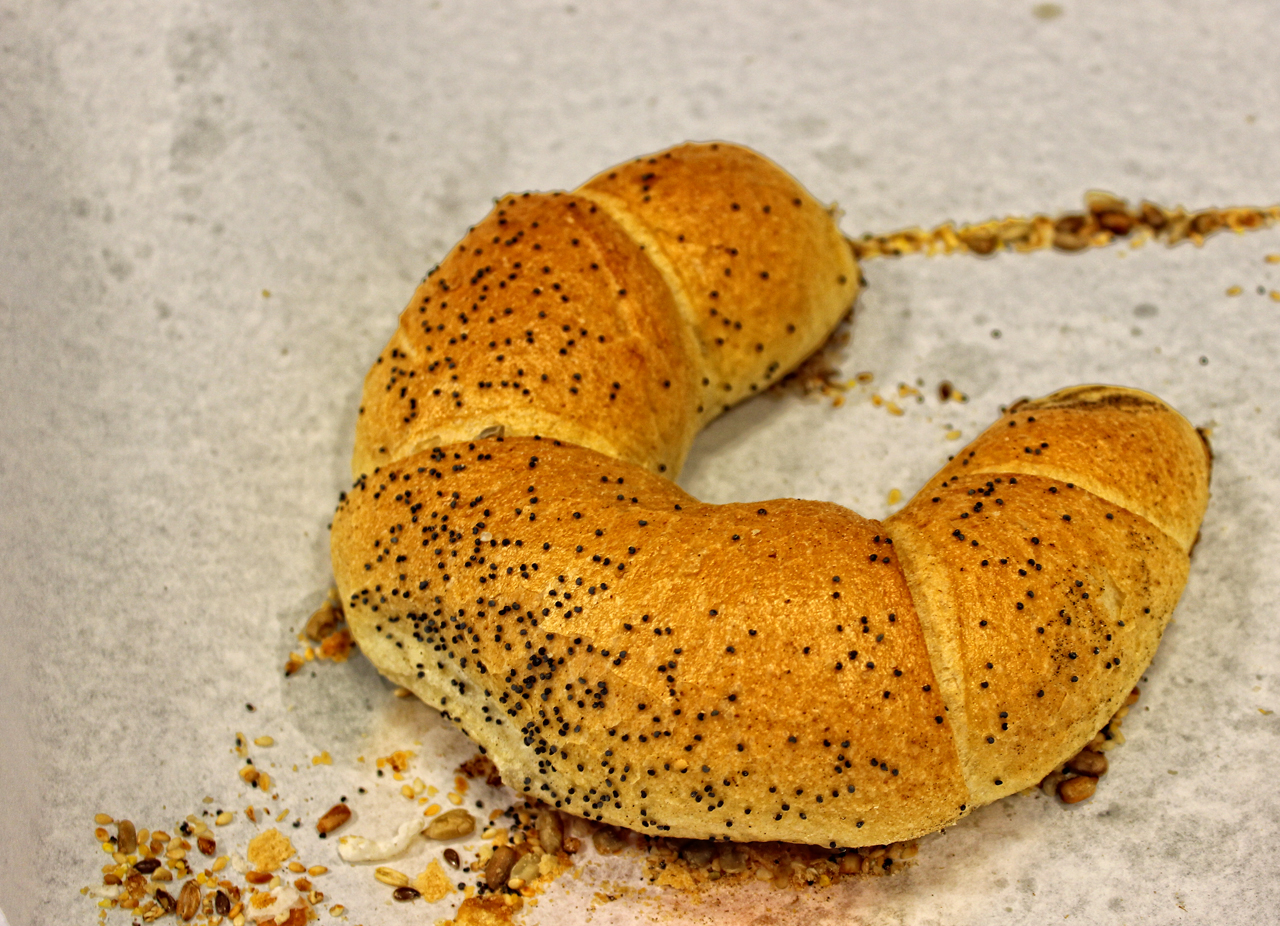
Rogal

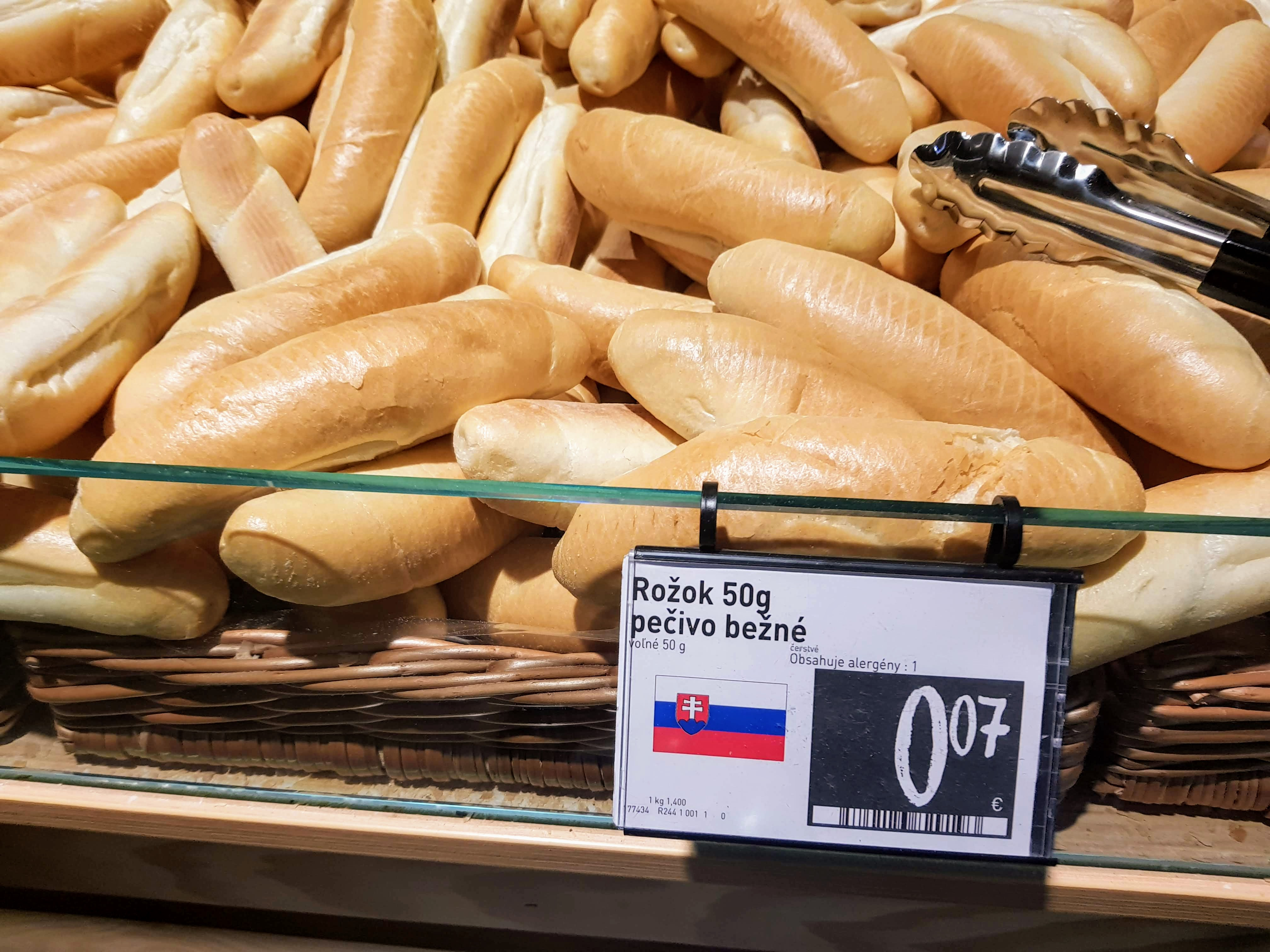
Rožok

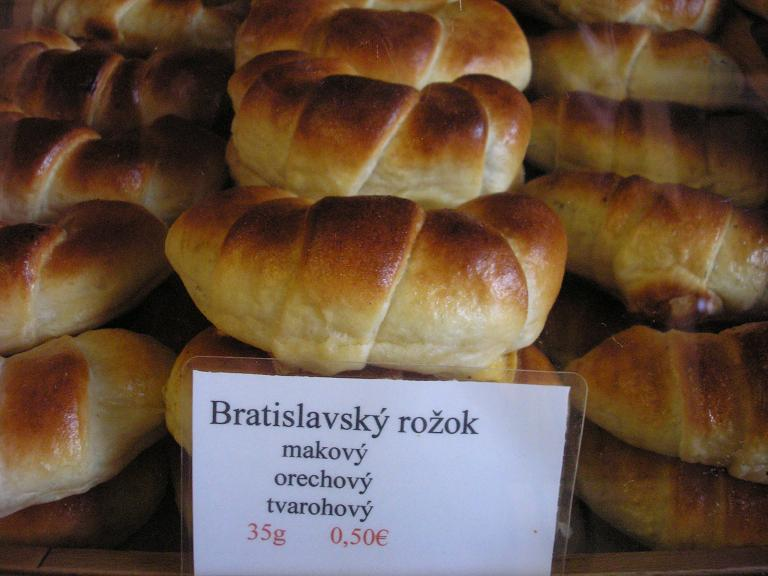
Bratislavsky rožok

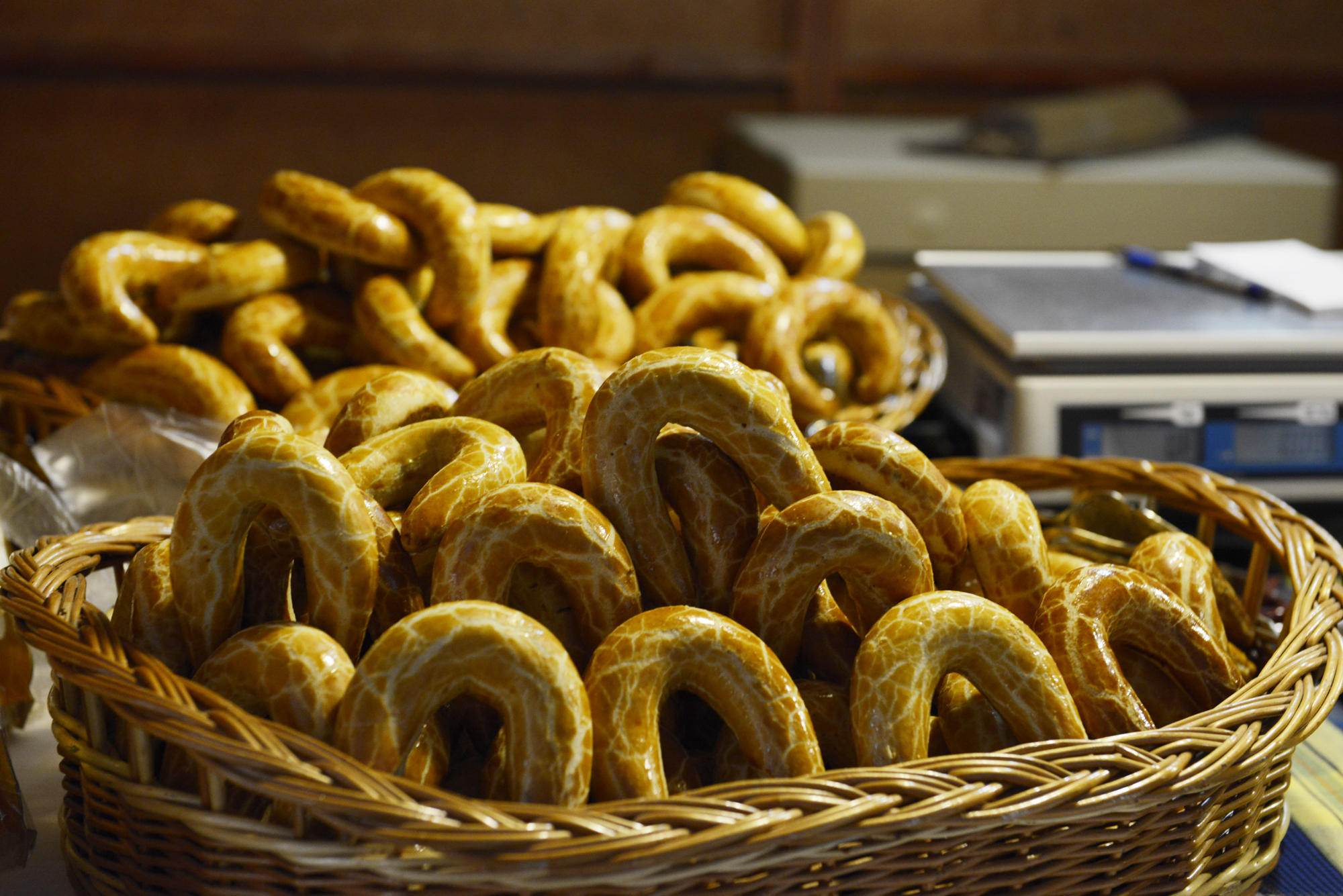
Pozsonyi kifli

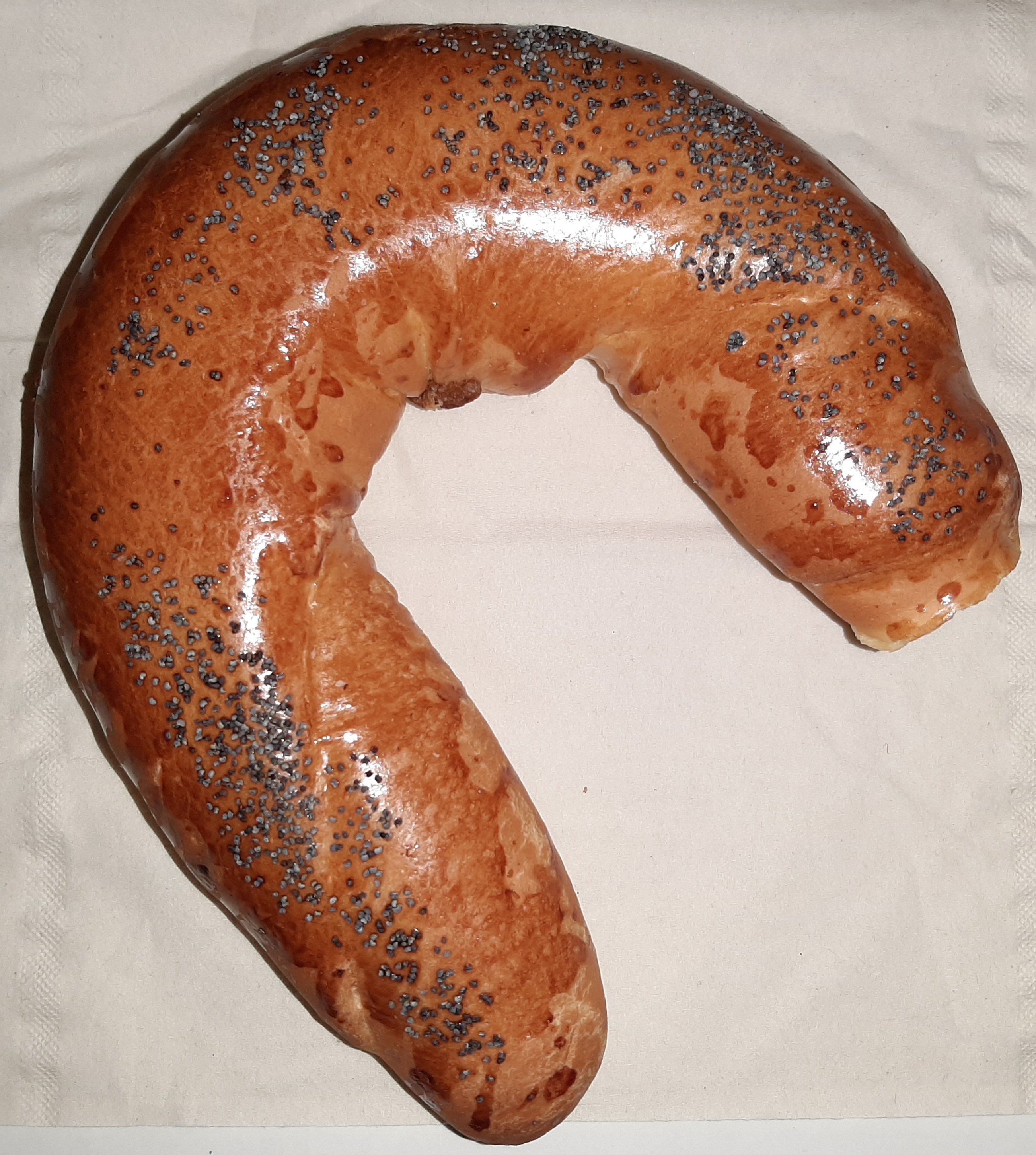
Lupáčik

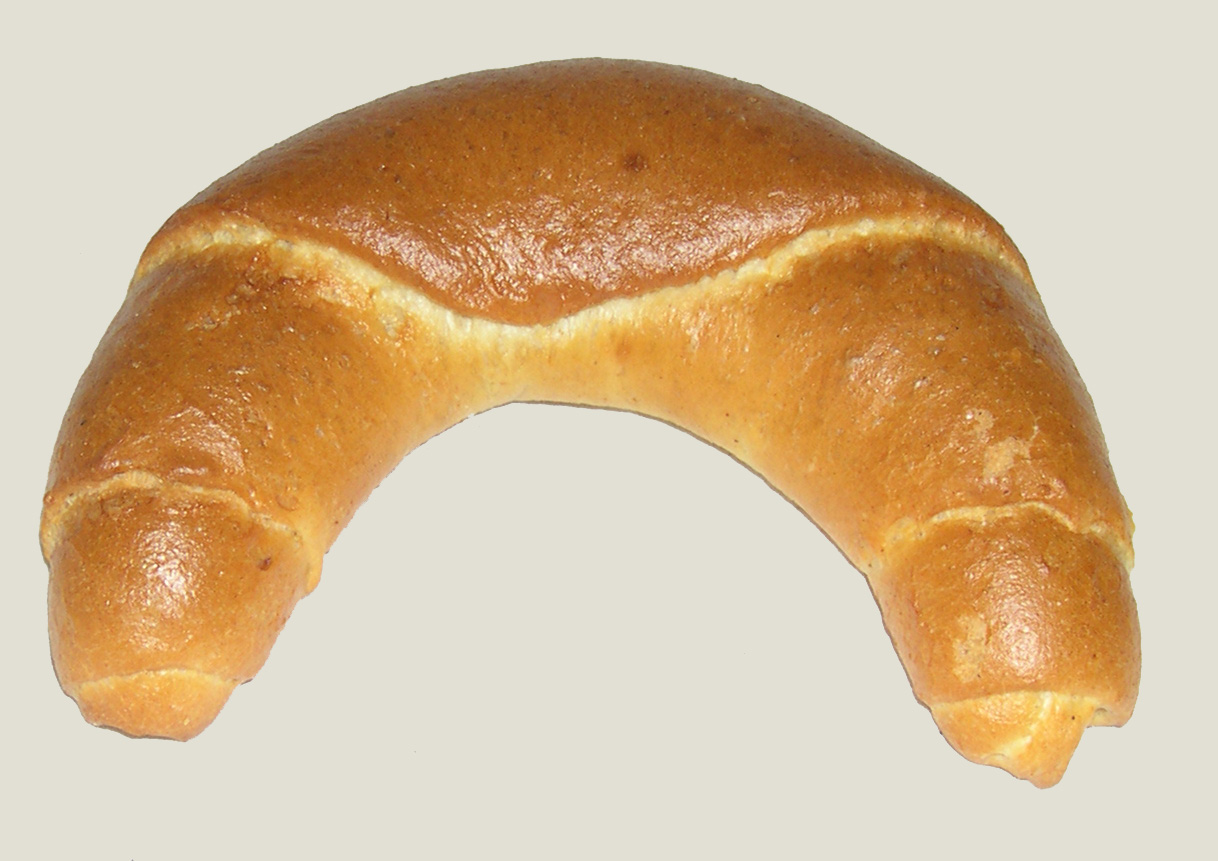
Hörnchen
Commercial rohlík production in the Czech Republic

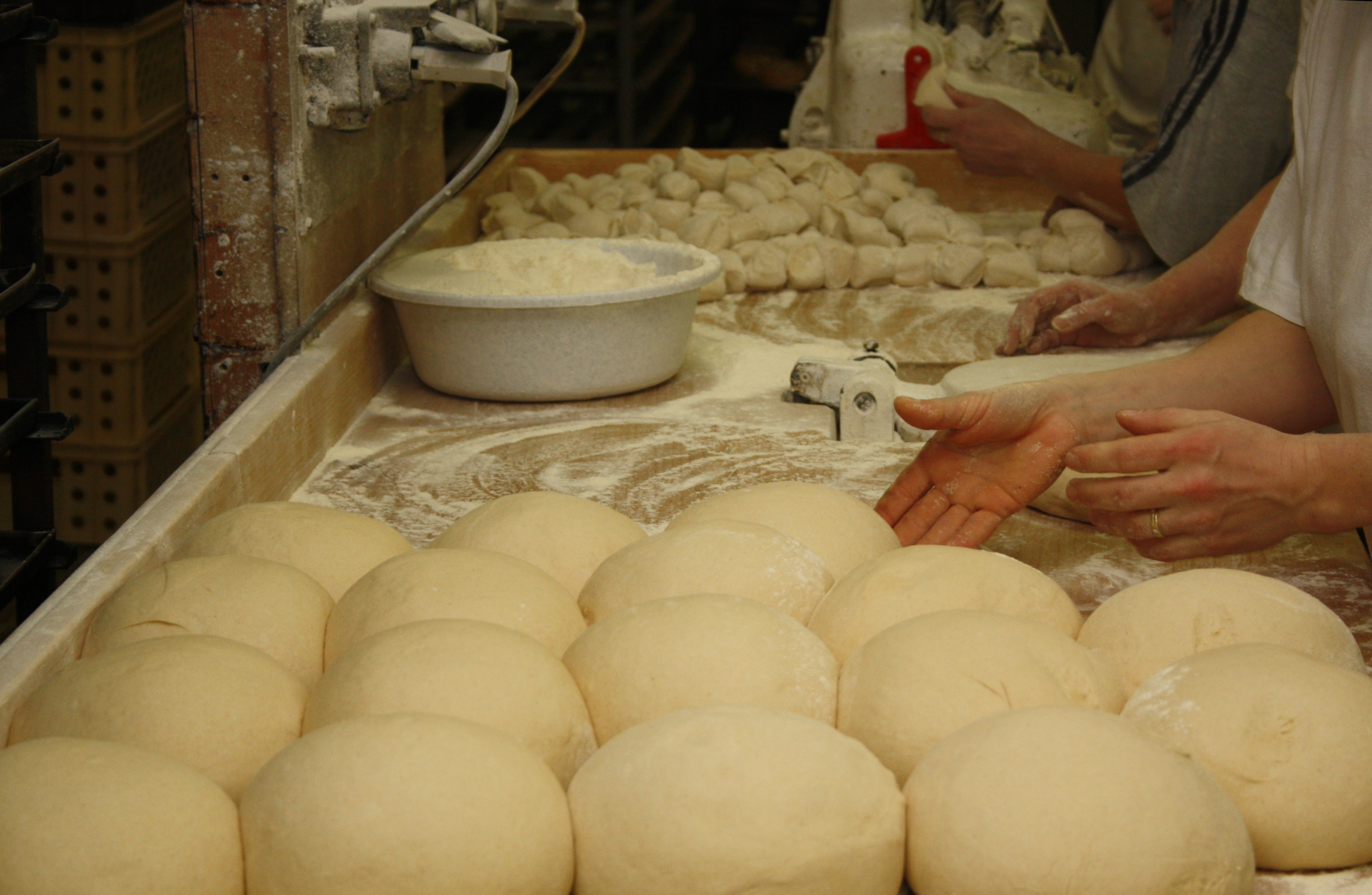
Loaves of dough before splitting

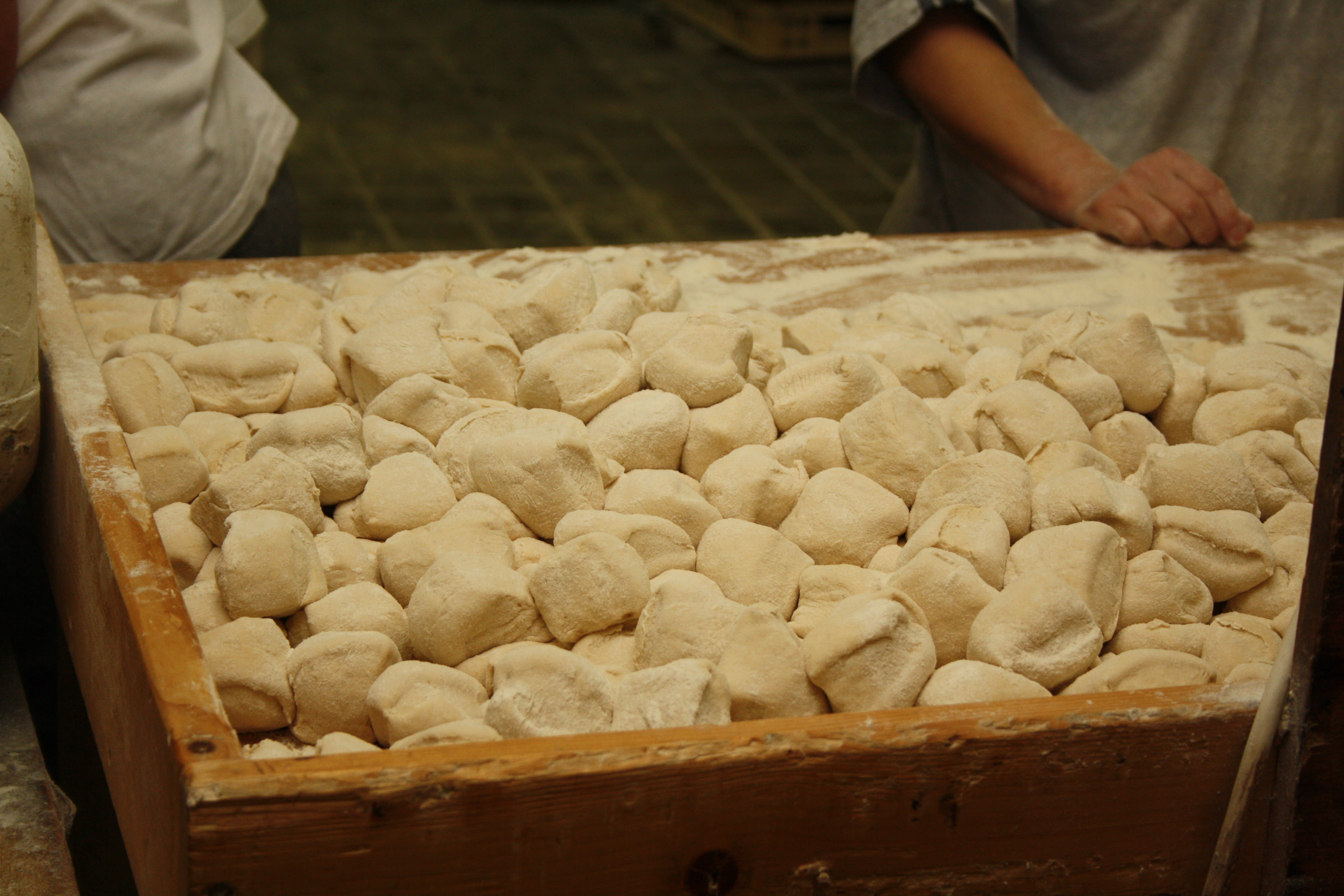
Small chunks of dough

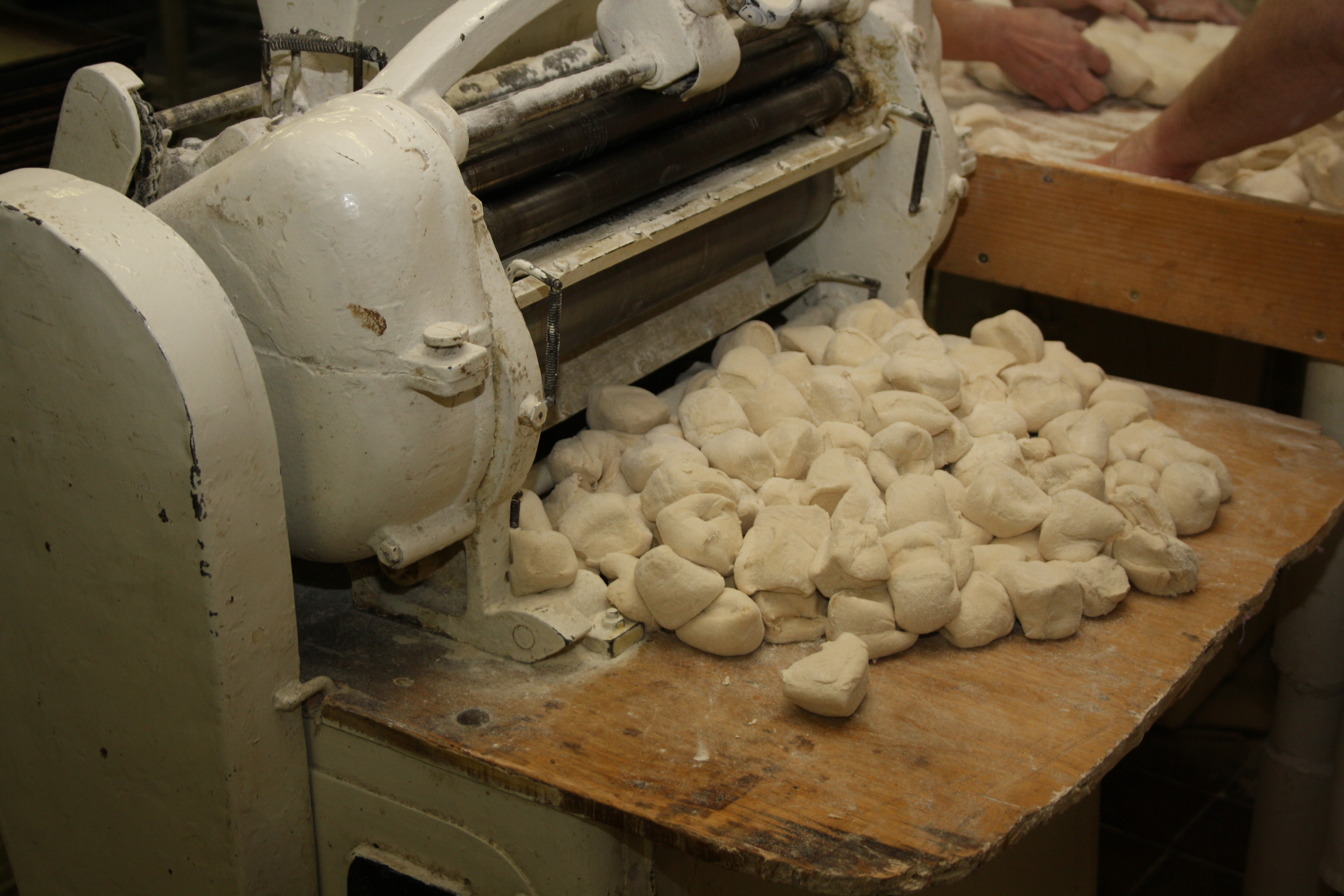
Dough before insertion into rohlík machine

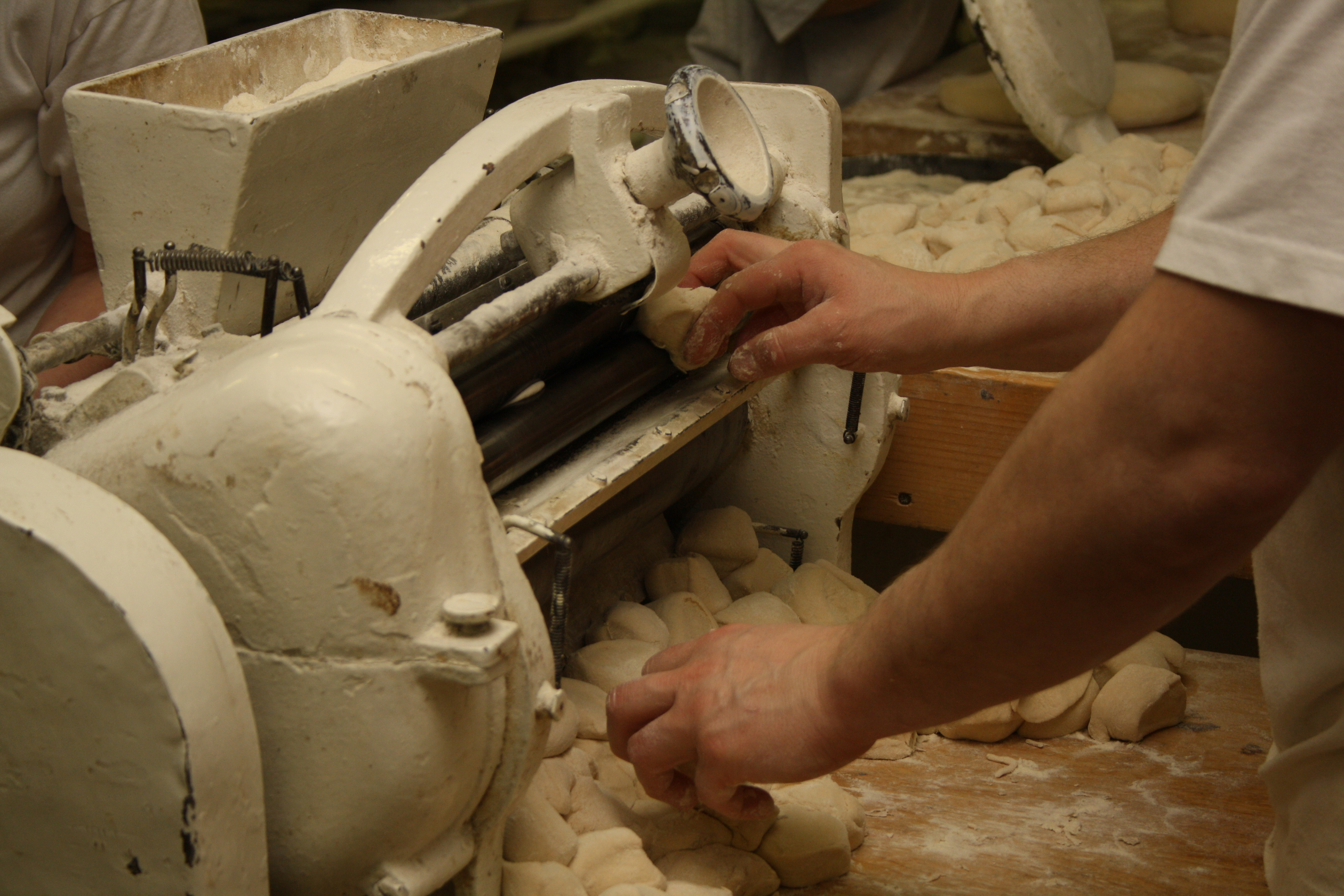
Inserting dough, machine rolls rohlík automatically

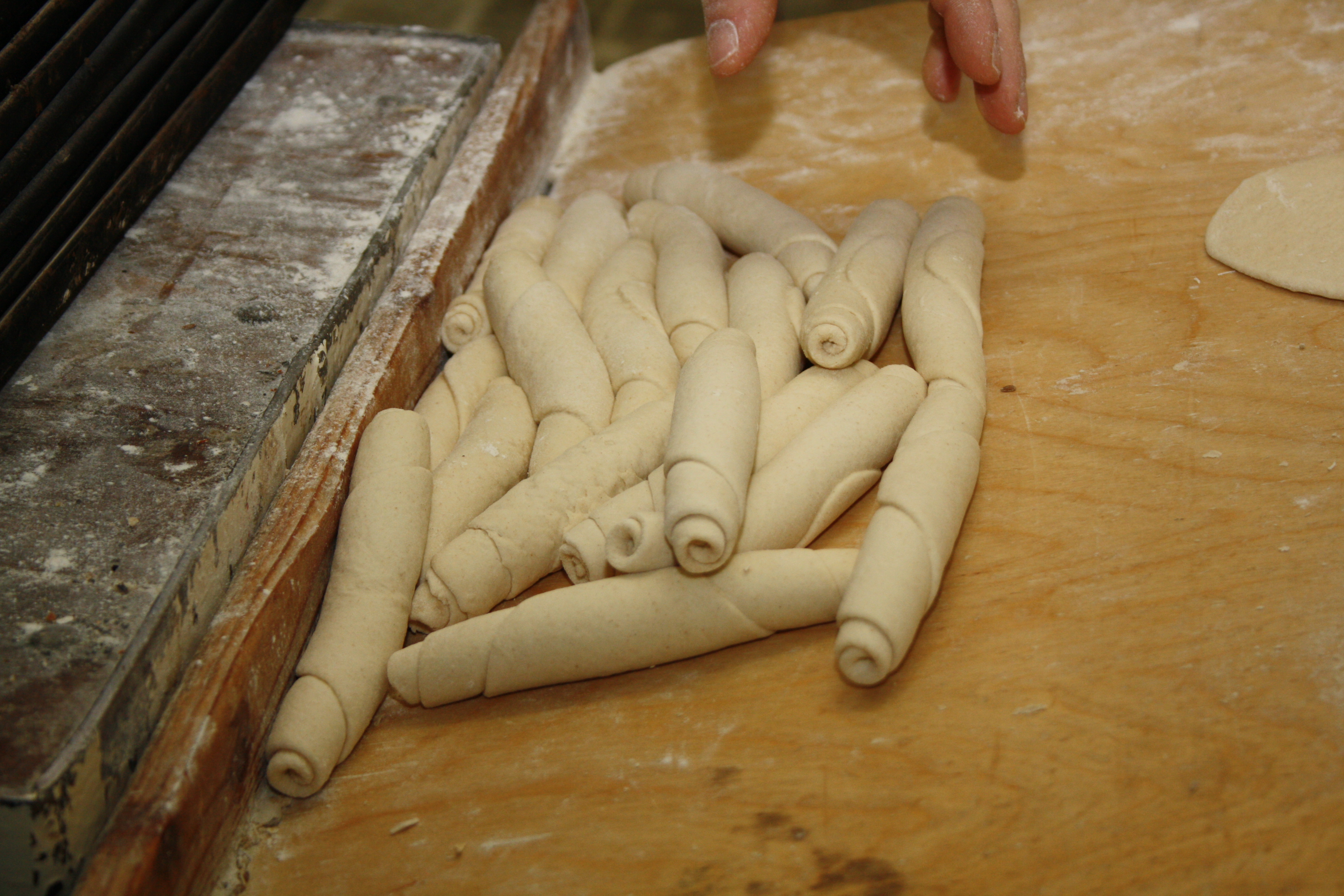
Rolled rohlík before baking

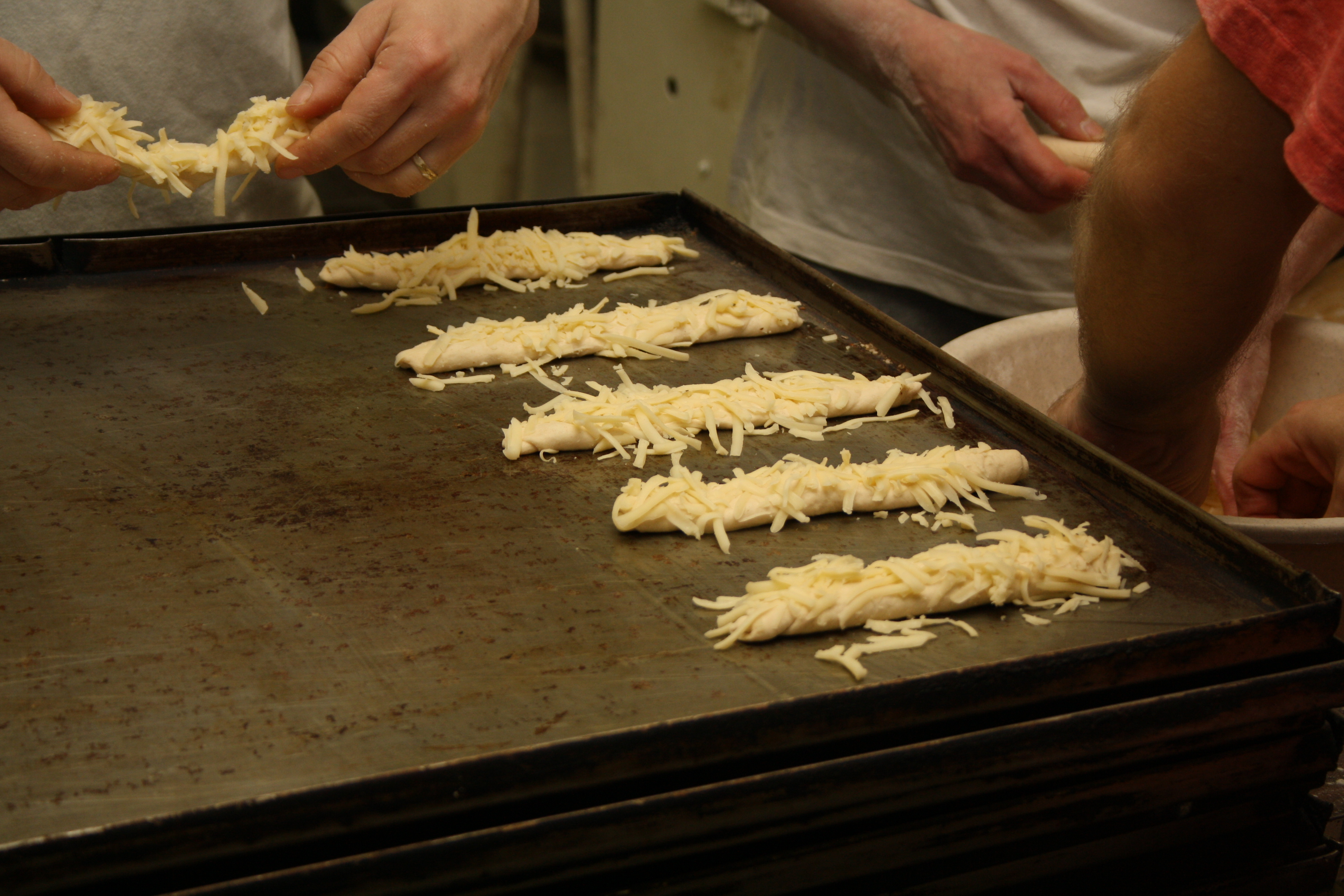
Creative variations

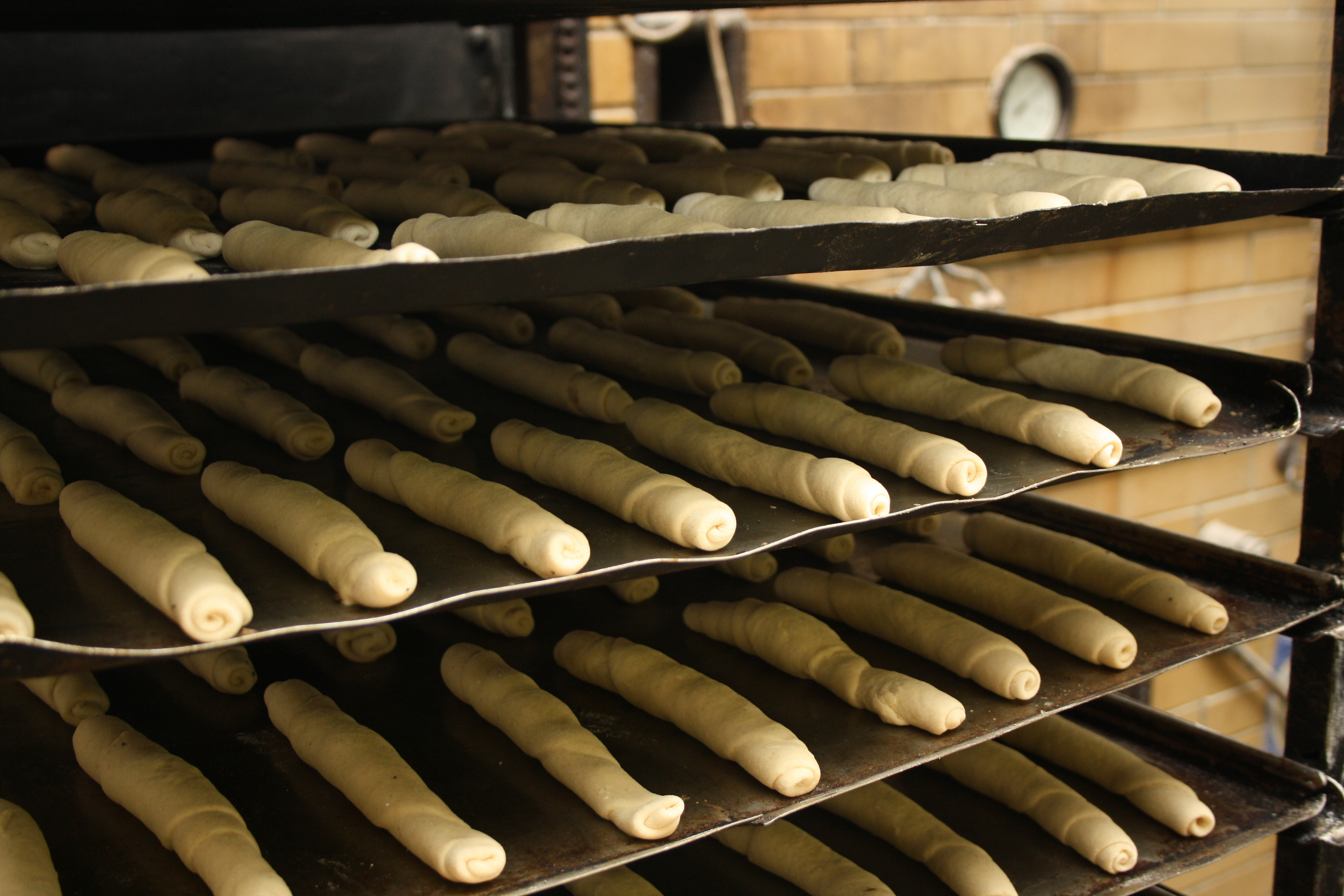
Proofing before baking

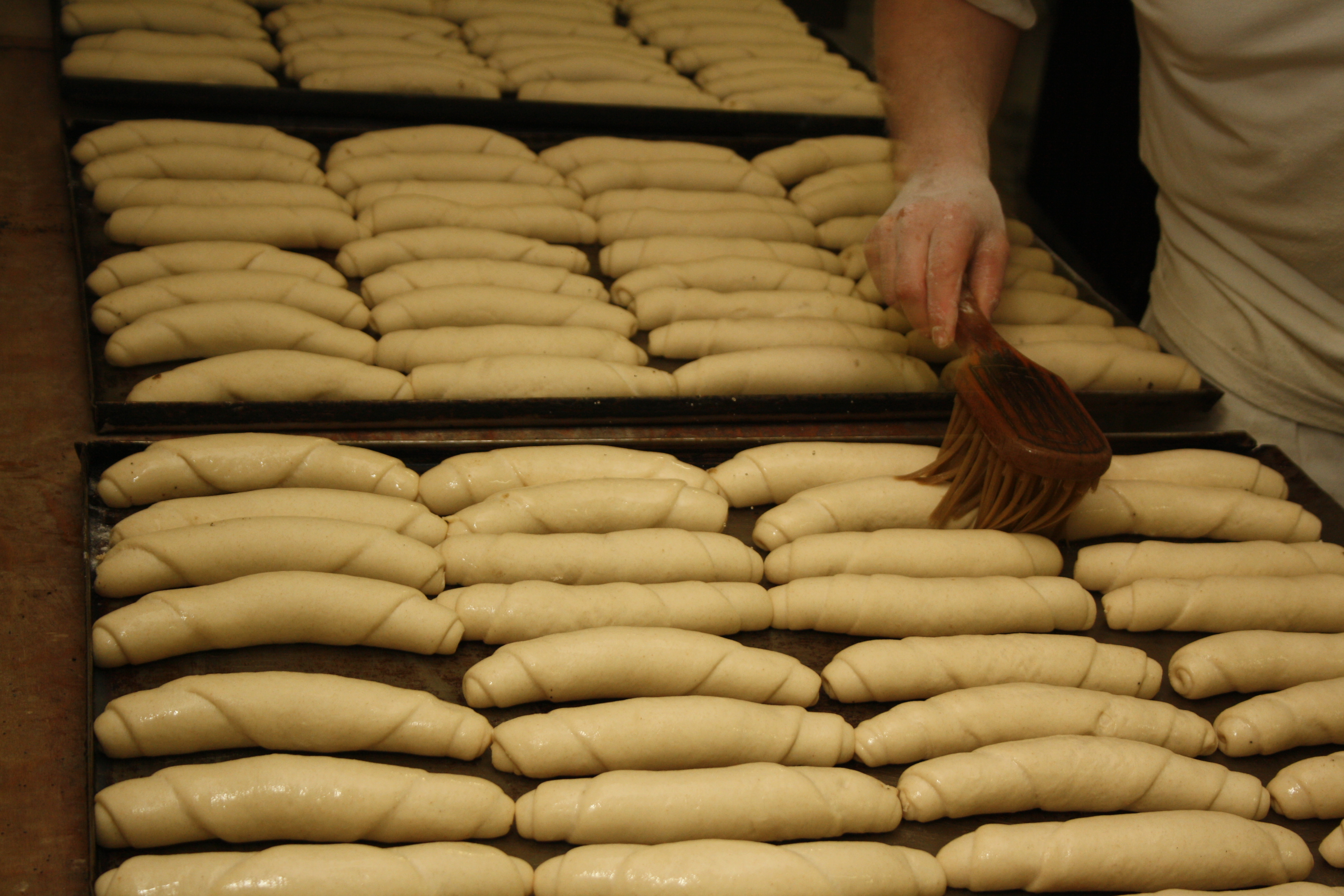
Watering a rohlík

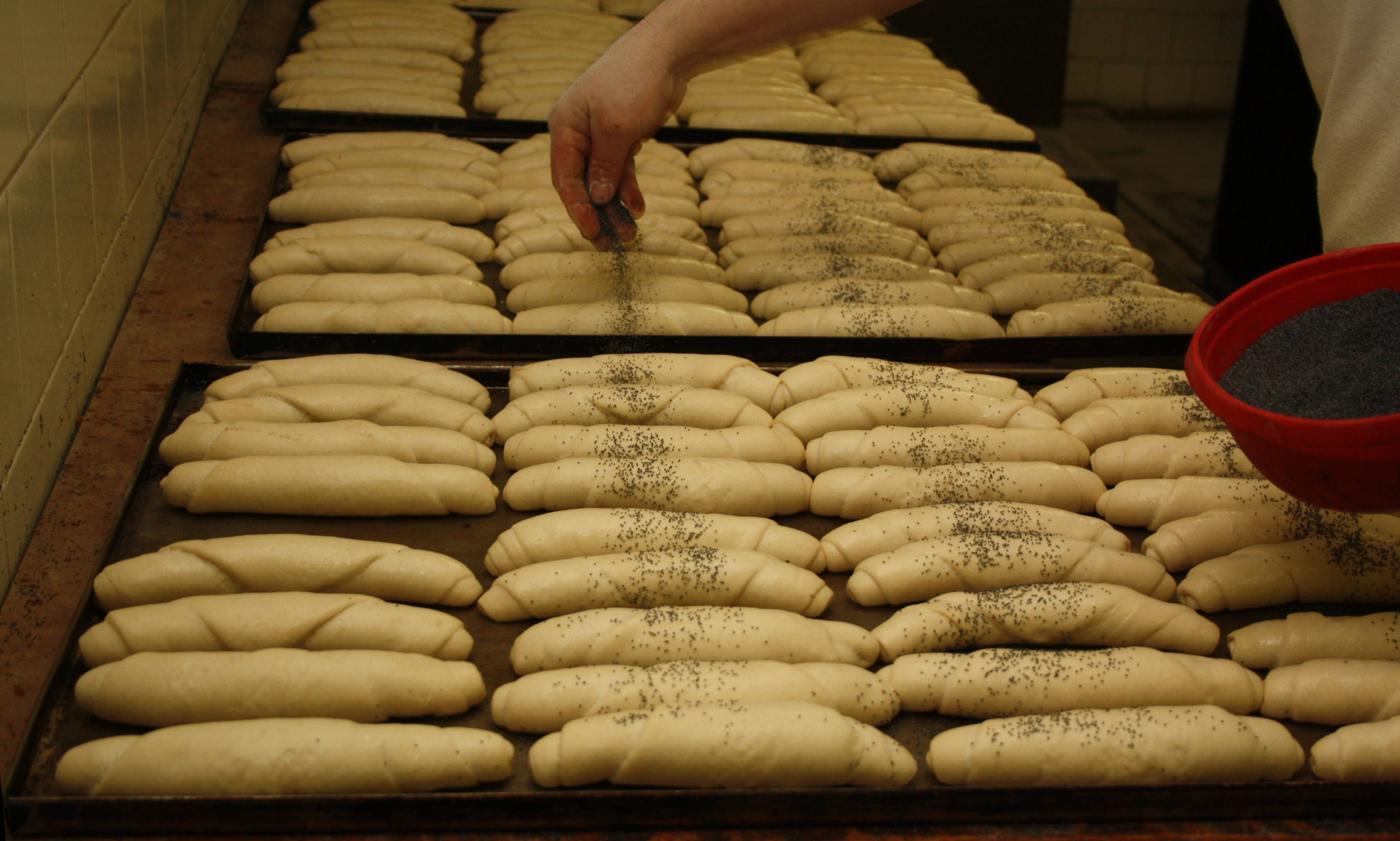
Sprinkling with poppy

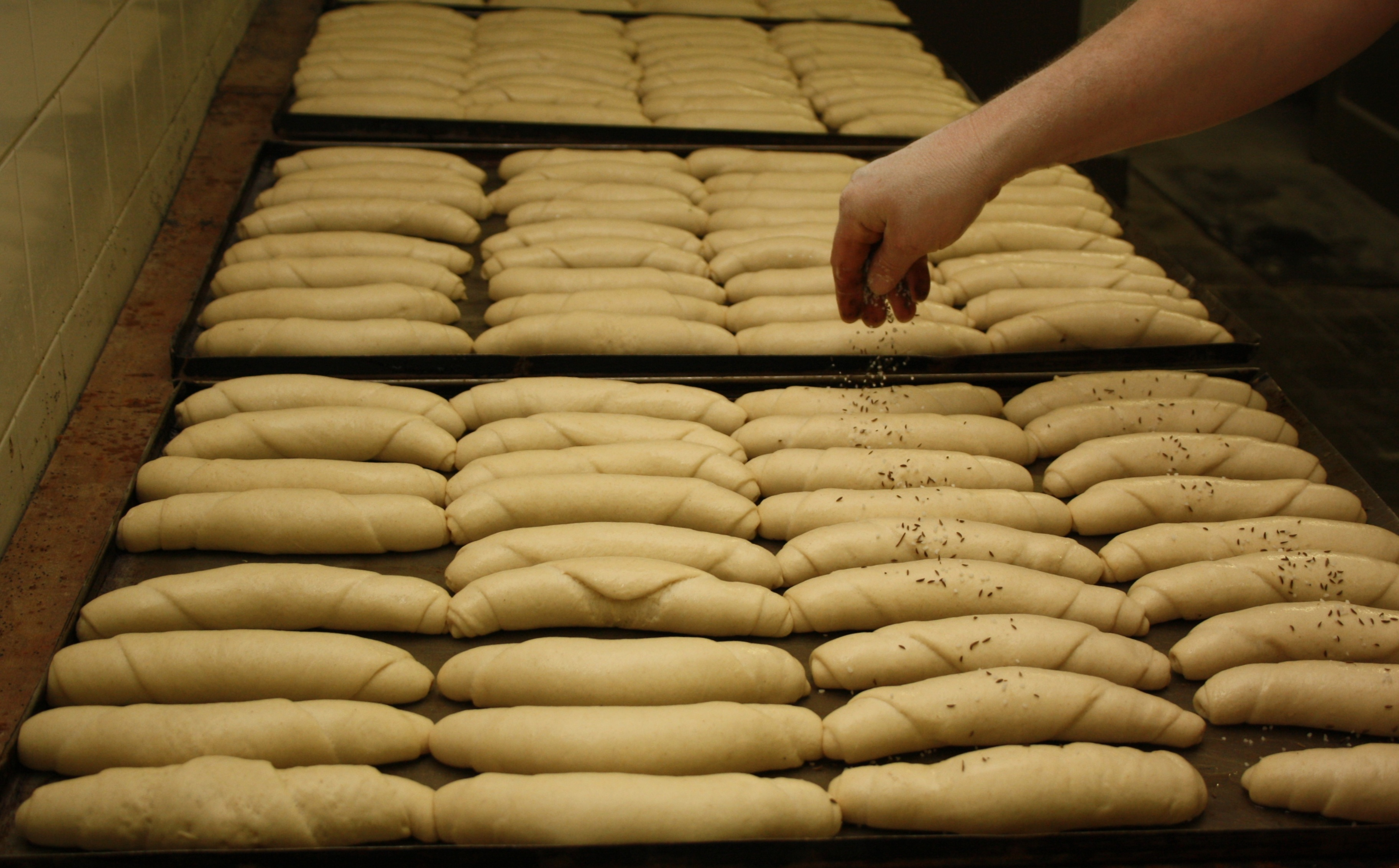
Salt and caraway seed variation

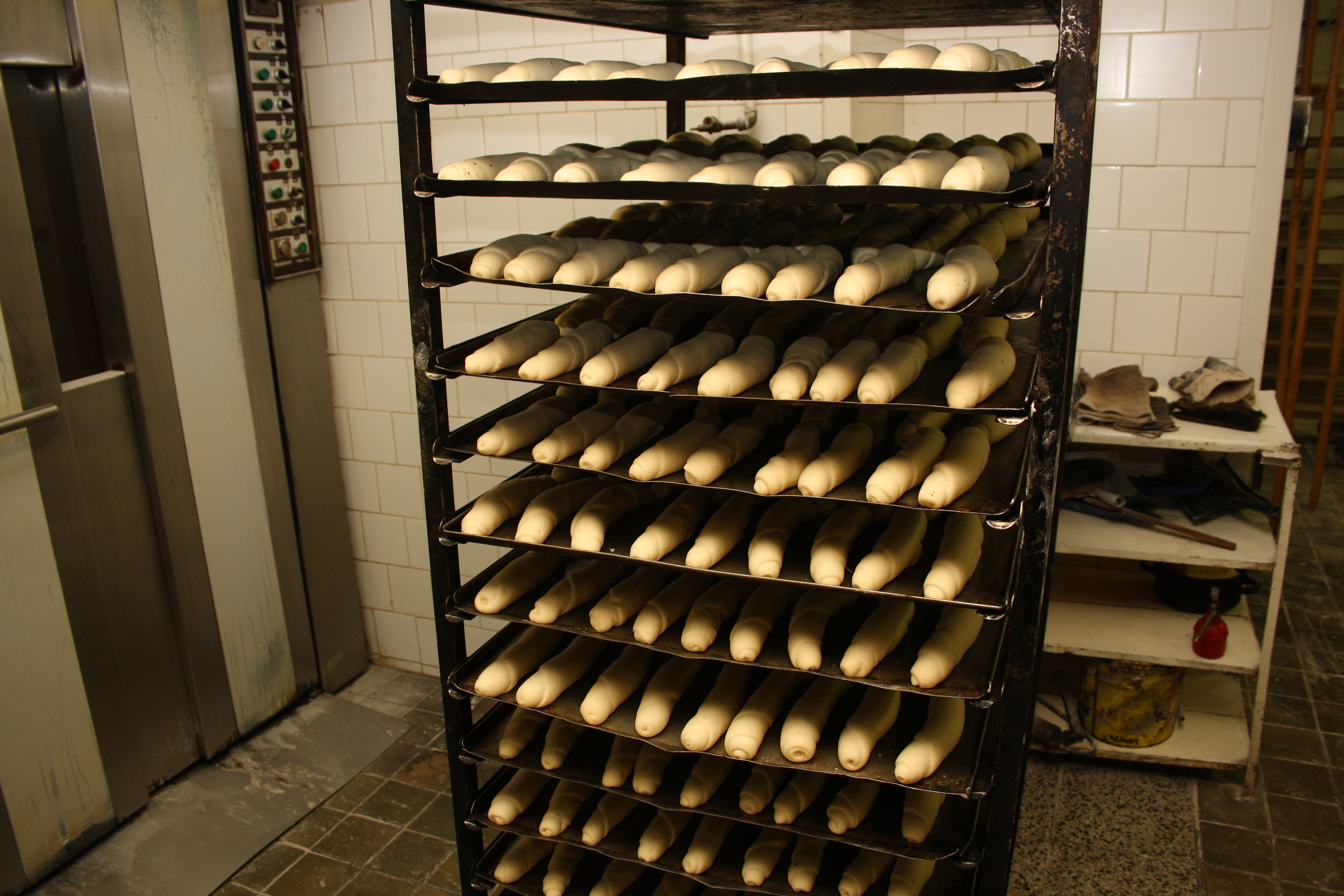
Rohlík in front of steam furnace

== See also ==
- List of breads
- Cornetto, an Italian crescent pastry
- Rogal świętomarciński, a crescent cake baked in Poznań, Poland, for St. Martin's Day
- Rugelach, a filled crescent pastry popular in Jewish communities in Poland
