= Réveillon =

Celebratory dinner

A réveillon (French: [ʁevɛjɔ̃]) is a long dinner held on Christmas Eve or New Year's Eve. Its name descends from the word réveil (meaning "waking"), because participation involves staying awake until morning, as the meal finishes.

The practice is observed in Belgium; France; Brazil; Romania; the Canadian provinces of Quebec, Manitoba, Ontario, Alberta and New Brunswick; the US city of New Orleans; and some other French-speaking places. In Portuguese-speaking countries, it is also a designation for the party preceding New Year's Day. In the United States, the réveillon tradition is still observed in New Orleans due to the city's strong French-Creole heritage, with a number of the city's restaurants offering special réveillon menus on Christmas Eve. It is also observed by many Franco-American families throughout New England.

The term is first documented in 18th-century France, and was used by the French as a name for the night-long party dinners held by the nobility. Eventually the word began to be used by other courts (amongst them the Portuguese courts) and after the French Revolution it was adopted as a definition of the New Year's Eve.

== Food ==
The food consumed at réveillons is generally exceptional or luxurious. For example, appetizers may include lobster, oysters, escargots or foie gras, etc. One traditional dish is turkey with chestnuts. Réveillons in Quebec will often include some variety of tourtière.

Dessert may consist of a Yule log, known as a bûche de Noël. In Provence, the tradition of the thirteen desserts is followed: 13 desserts are served, almost invariably including pompe à l'huile (a flavoured bread), dates, etc.

Quality wine is usually consumed at such dinners, often with champagne or similar sparkling wines as a conclusion.

== Differences ==
There are certain traditional differences of character between the Christmas and New Year's Day réveillons.

Christmas is traditionally a Christian occasion, celebrated within the family, and this family character is retained even among non-believers.

The New Year's Eve, or Saint-Sylvestre, réveillon, on the other hand, is commonly a party with friends, etc. People may also go out to a cabaret show, or watch live relays of such shows on television.

== Name in other countries ==
- In Italy, it is called Cenone di Natale for Christmas and Cenone di Capodanno for New Year.
- In Poland, it is called Wigilia for Christmas.
- In Portugal and Brazil, it is called Ceia de Natal for Christmas, and Ceia de Ano Novo for New Year. Additionally, the word réveillon (alternatively called "virada do ano" in Brazil) refers nationally to the New Year's Eve.
- In Lithuania, it is called "Kūčios" for Christmas.

== See also ==
- List of dining events
- Wigilia
- Nochebuena
