= Baulus =

Baulus may refer to:

- Baulus, Turkey, a village identified with the ancient site of Berissa, 25 kilometres south-west of Tokat
- Bolus (Belgium), a Belgian pastry
