= Tarte tropézienne =

French dessert viennoiserie

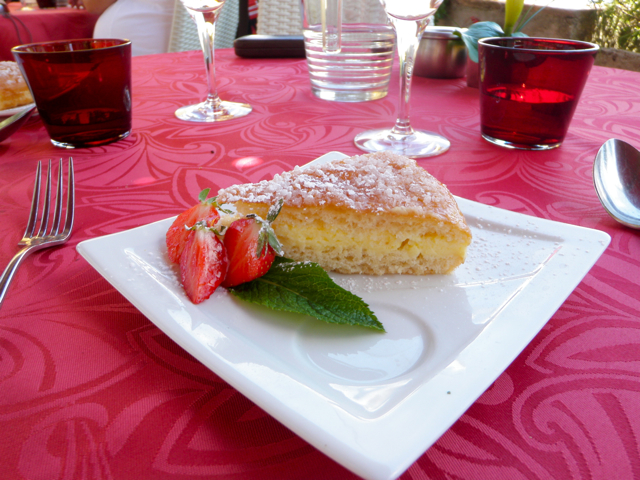
- Alternative names: La tarte de Saint-Tropez
- Course: Dessert viennoiserie
- Place of origin: France
- Region or state: Saint-Tropez, French Riviera
- Created by: Alexandre Micka

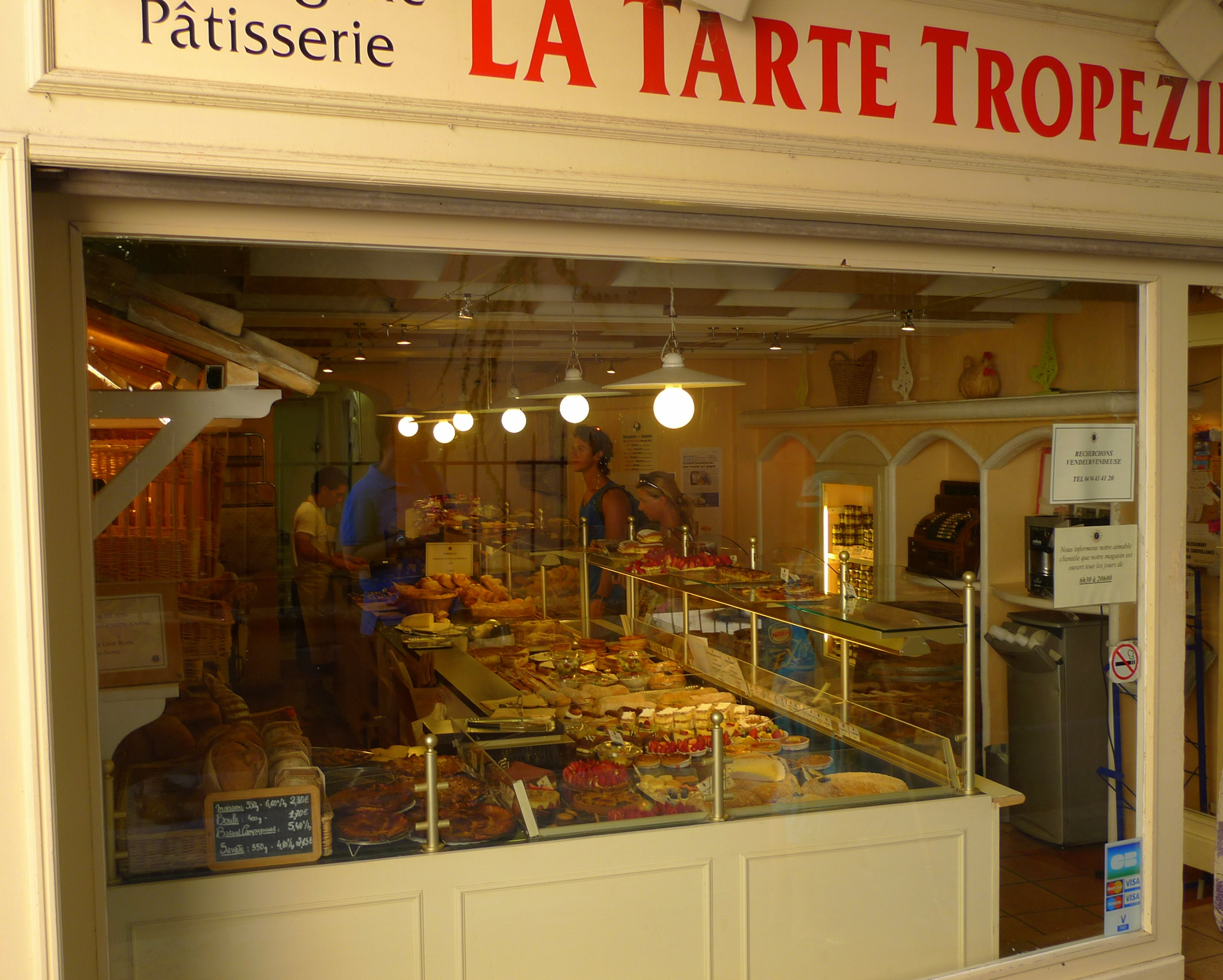
Micka's pâtisserie "La Tarte Tropézienne"

Tarte tropézienne, also known as "la tarte de Saint-Tropez", is a dessert viennoiserie consisting of a halved brioche filled with a mix of two creams, thick crème pâtissière and buttercream, and topped with pearl sugar. It was created in 1955 by Polish confectioner Alexandre Micka, a pâtisserie owner in Saint-Tropez, where he moved in 1945 just after the war.

Micka adapted a family recipe (the legend says it was his grandmother's recipe) to create the first version of tarte tropézienne in 1952. A few years later, actress Brigitte Bardot developed a taste for the pastries while she was in Saint-Tropez filming And God Created Woman. and it was in fact she who suggested the name, which Micka registered as a trademark in 1973.

Micka's original shop, La Tarte Tropézienne, still exists. Since the 1970s, the same dessert has also been popular in Prague, where it is known as the "Prague cake" (pražský koláč). It is not known whether this cake was baked in Prague earlier than in France.
