= Chocolate croissant =

Chocolate croissant may refer to:

- A croissant filled with chocolate
- Pain au chocolat, a laminated dough pastry containing pieces of chocolate
