= Xuixo =

Deep-fried pastry

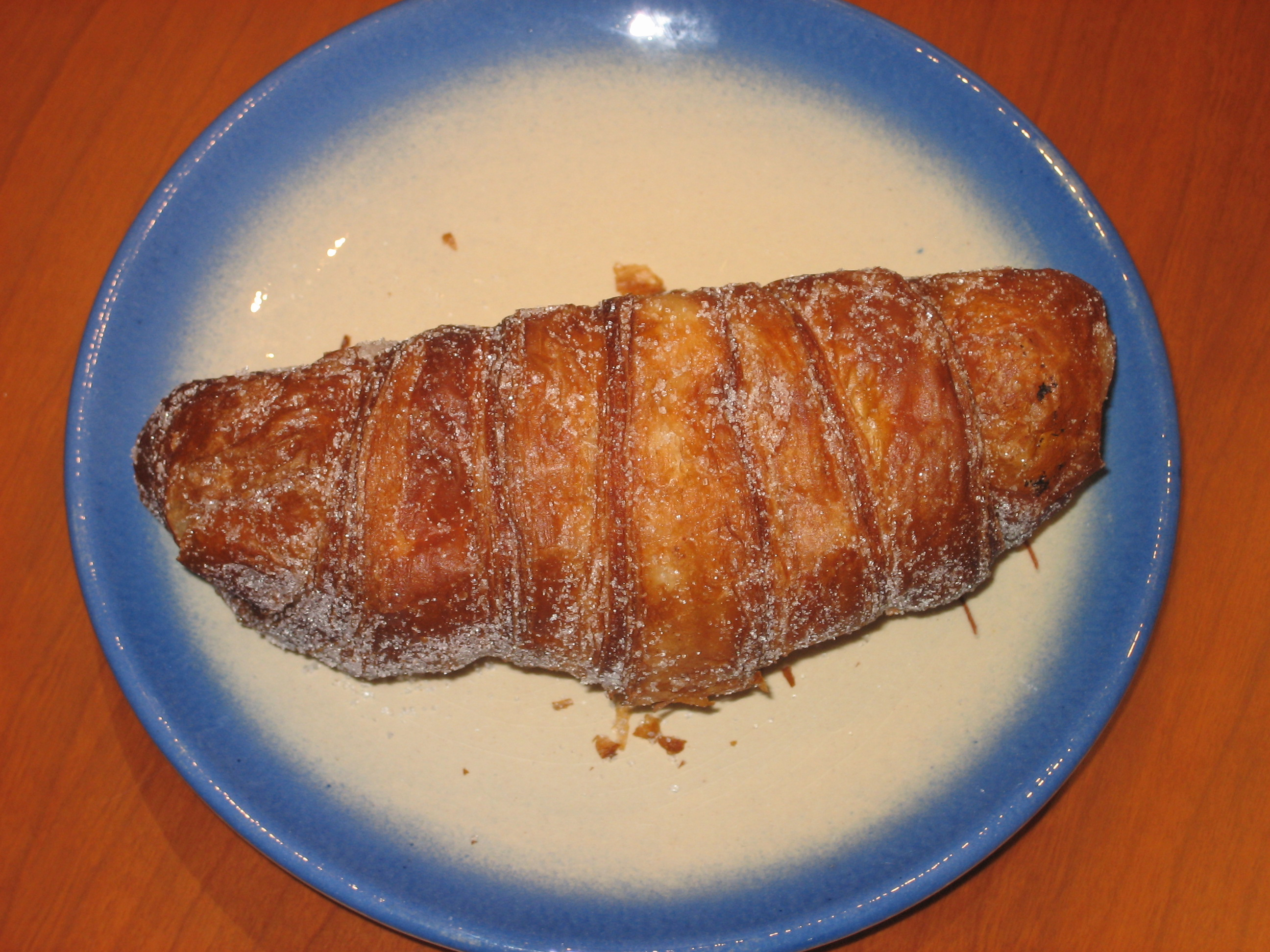
- Alternative names: Xuxo
- Type: Pastry
- Course: Breakfast or tea
- Place of origin: Spain
- Region or state: Catalonia
- Main ingredients: Crema catalana, sugar

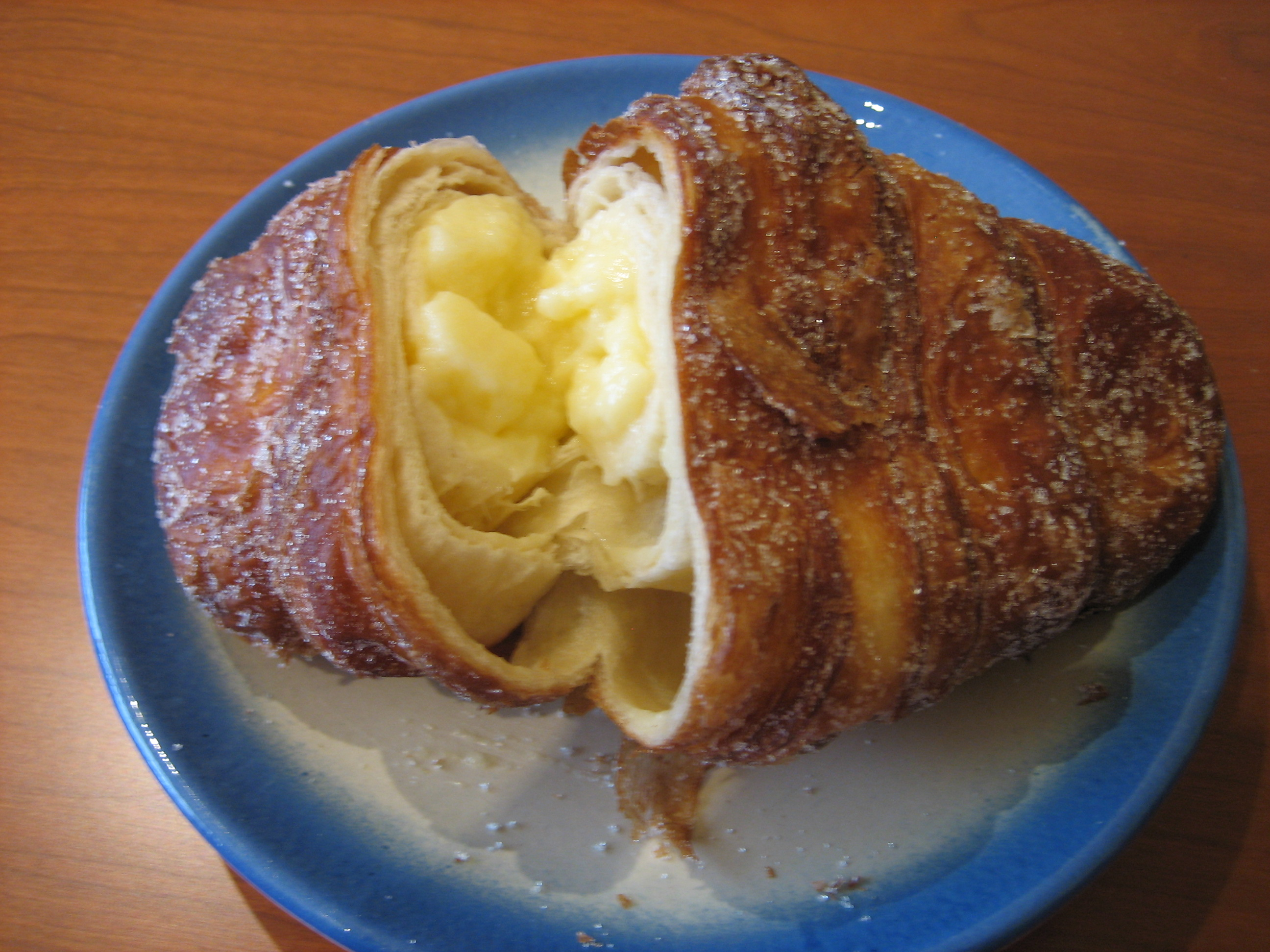
A xuixo cut open

Xuixo (Catalan pronunciation: [ˈʃuʃu]; also known as xuxo; Spanish: suso) is a viennoiserie from the city of Girona in Catalonia, Spain. It is a deep-fried, sugar-coated cylindrical product filled with crema catalana. Commonly eaten for breakfast or tea, it is honored as Producte de la Terra (English: Product of the home country) by the Department of Agriculture, Farming and Fishing of the Government of Catalonia.

It is assumed that this viennoiserie originated in 1920s Girona in a shop owned by Emili Puig in the Street Cort Reial. A French pâtisserie showed Puig the preparation of cream-filled viennoiserie and this inspired him to create the Xuixo.

This viennoiserie is very popular not only in Girona but has been also accepted in the surrounding areas and can also be found in Tarragona, Castellón de la Plana and Valencia.

In the second half of the 20th century it was one of the most demanded product in the Xurreries (pastry shops, Spanish: churrerías) and nowadays it is commercialized by a candy brand that sells them not plain but with a chocolate icing.

== Legend ==
According to a legend in Girona, the invention of the Xuixo has to be credited to el Tarlà, a very sympathetic person that is very present in the legends of this area. This acrobat that entertained the citizens in a quarantine during an epidemic fell in love with the daughter of a pastry chef. Once, when he visited his beloved girl, her father appeared, and he hid in a bag of flour. Unfortunately, he sneezed (which sounds like xui-xui) and was discovered. Before the pastry chef could get angry, he promised to marry his daughter and to give him the recipe of a special pastry: the Xuixo. He named it after the sneeze that betrayed him. Nowadays, a figure of el Tarlà can be seen every year during the spring festivities when its copy is erected at the place where he had entertained the people of Girona.

== Xuixo procession ==
The foundation "Fundació Oncolliga Girona" and the government of Girona organize the popular procession Marxa del Xuixo. It is a procession in which the whole family participates and strolls through the streets of Girona to discover the city's natural surroundings. After the walk the participants are given Xuixos that have been prepared by the board of pastry chefs of Girona.
