= New York roll =

Pastry made from croissant dough

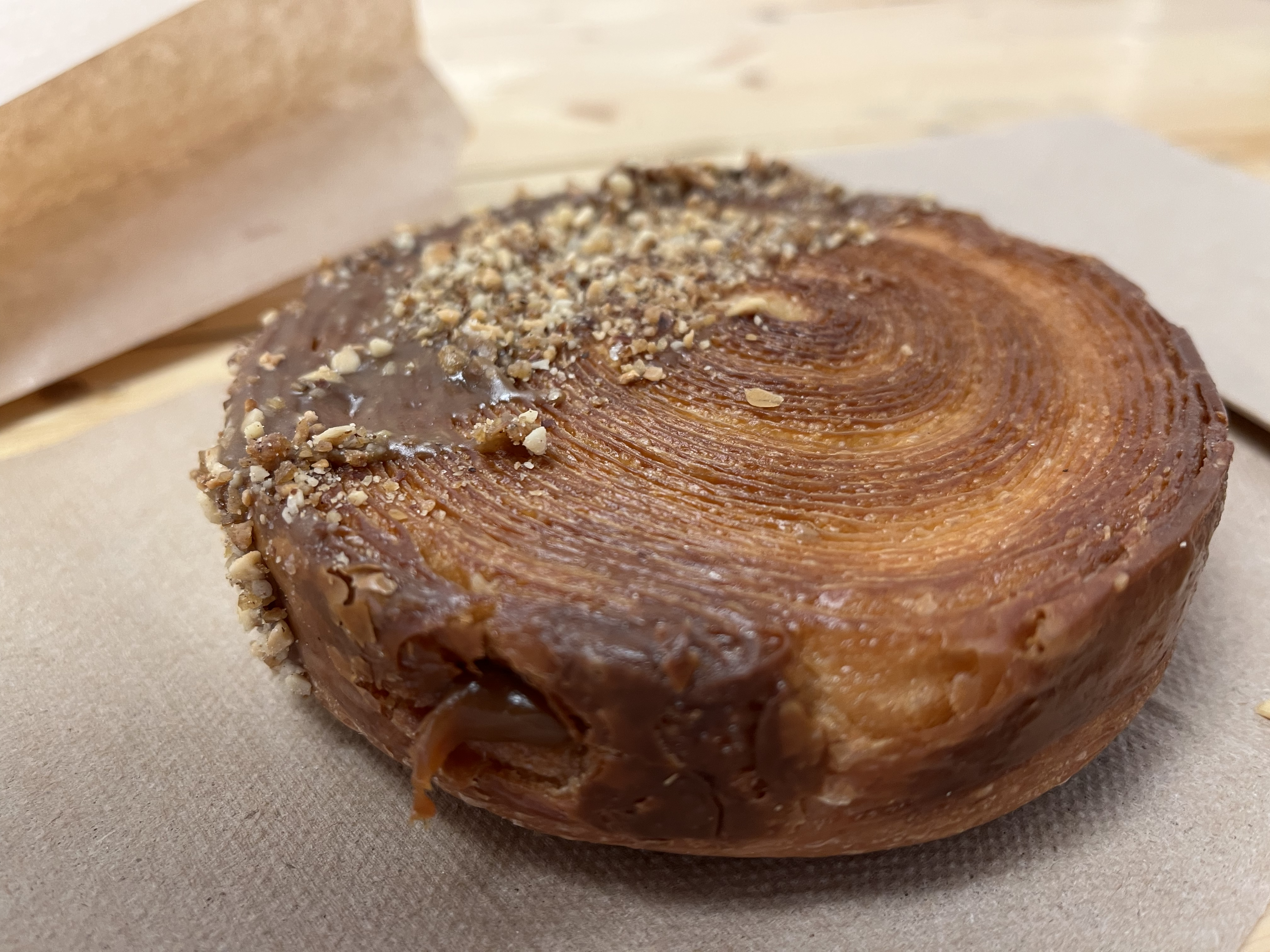
- New York roll
- Alternative names: New York roll croissant, Cromboloni, Croissant bomboloni, The Suprême, Supreme croissant
- Type: Viennoiserie
- Course: Dessert, Breakfast, Snack
- Place of origin: United States
- Created by: Lafayette Grand Café and Bakery
- Invented: 2022
- Serving temperature: warm
- Main ingredients: Croissant dough, pastry cream, chocolate ganache
- Food energy (per serving): 300 (with filling)/200 (without filling)

The New York roll or cromboloni (a mix of croissant and bomboloni) is a viennoiserie that gained popularity in the 2020s through social media. Videos on TikTok that featured the roll gained hundred of thousands of views. It is made from circular croissant dough, and filled with pastry cream and topped with a chocolate ganache. It originated from the United States. It was originally called The Suprême. It can be enhanced with many different flavors such as chocolate, pistachio, and caramel.

It was created in 2022, by the New York establishment Lafayette Grand Café and Bakery and since then it has spread around the globe. In 2023, it was found in several cities in France, such as Nantes, Amiens, Strasbourg, and Paris. It cost 3 to 5 euros there at the time. The New York roll gained popularity across the globe, being offered in cities from Lithuania to Indonesia.
