= Prague cake =

Czech dessert

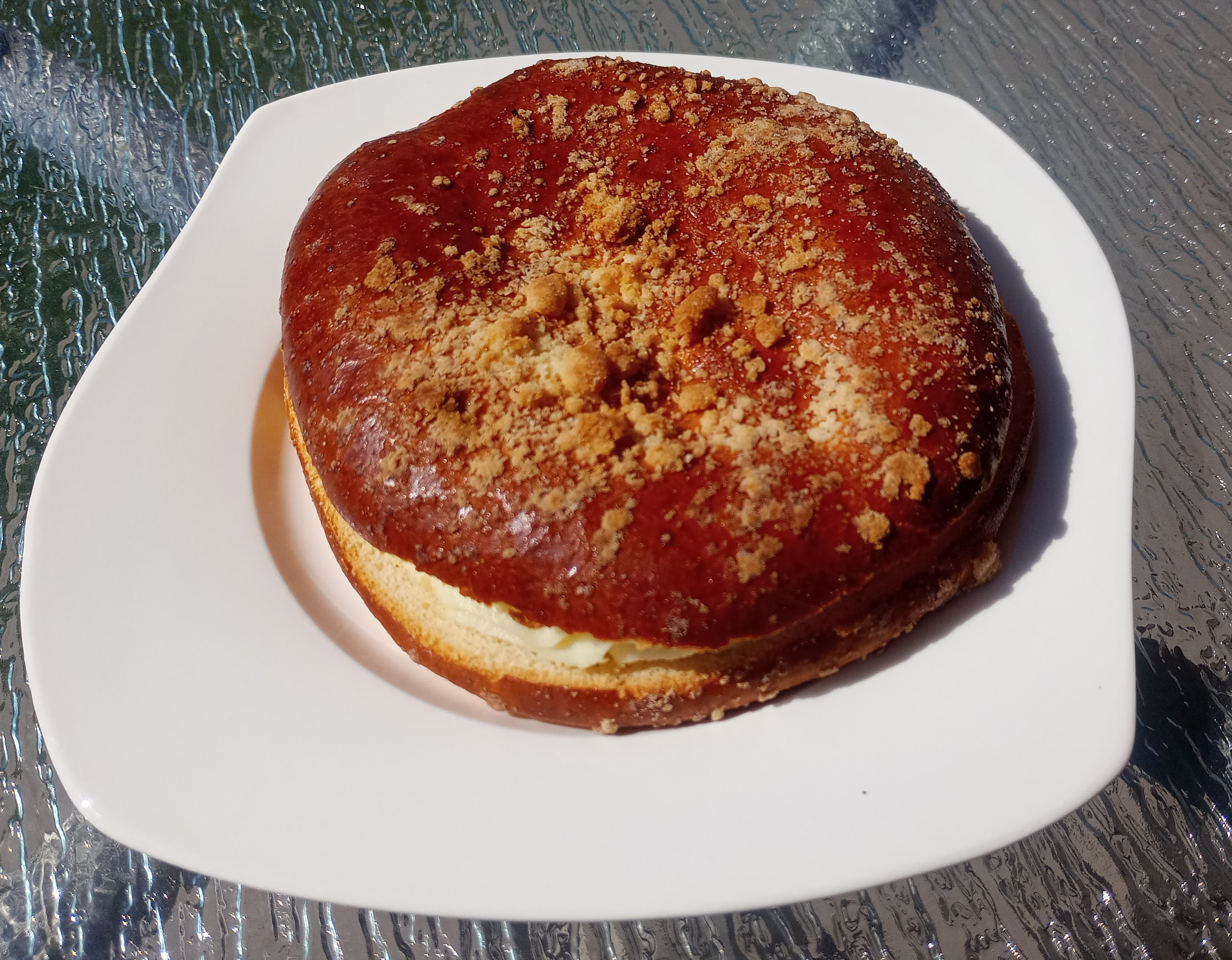
Prague cake

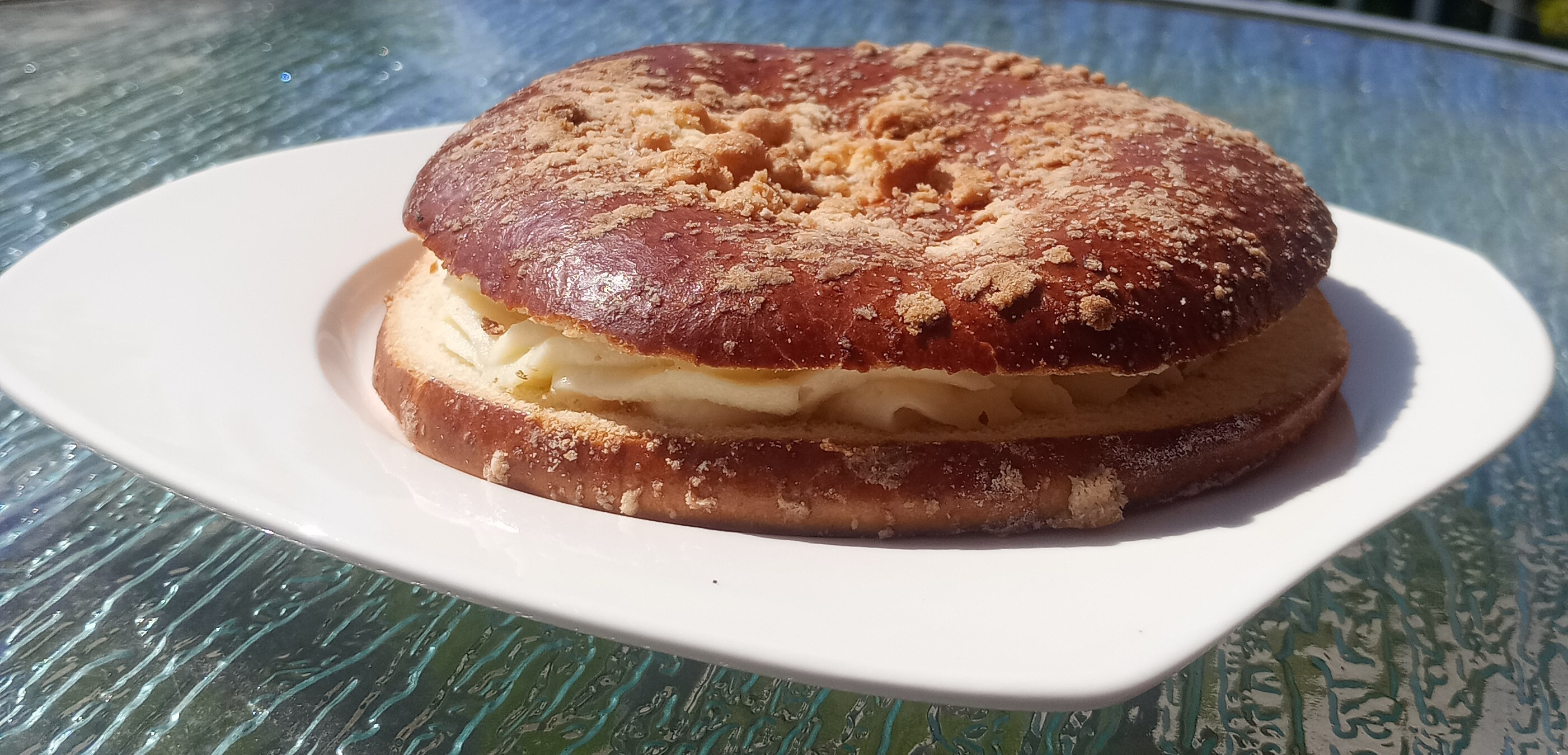
Prague cake

Prague cake (Czech: Pražský koláč) is a dessert typical of Czech cuisine (particularly the regional cuisine of Prague). It consists of a bun made from yeast dough topped with cinnamon streusel, which is horizontally sliced and filled with a vanilla pudding cream. According to the original recipe, mayonnaise was added to the dough.

== History ==
A very similar dessert is the tarte tropézienne, which was first baked in 1955 by Polish baker Alexandre Micka at his bakery in Saint-Tropez, France, supposedly based on a recipe from his Polish grandmother. However, unlike the Prague cake, the tarte tropézienne is filled with a cream made of cream and egg yolks, and it is made from brioche dough. In Saint-Tropez, it is considered a regional specialty.

It is unclear whether there is any direct connection between the tarte tropézienne and Prgue cake. Prague cake began appearing in Prague bakeries in the 1970s, although similar desserts had been made by Prague bakers even earlier. Prague cake reached its peak popularity during the period of communist Czechoslovakia.
