= Franzbrötchen =

German pastry

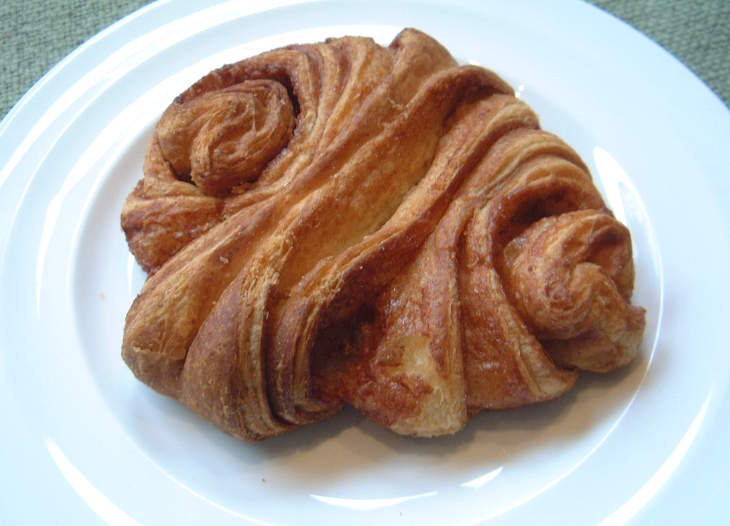
- Type: Viennoiserie
- Place of origin: Germany
- Main ingredients: Butter, cinnamon

A Franzbrötchen (German: [ˈfʁantsˌbʁøːtçɛn]) is a small, sweet Viennoiserie baked with butter and cinnamon, similar to a cinnamon roll. Sometimes other ingredients are used as well, such as chocolate or raisins. It is a type of viennoiserie commonly found in northern Germany, especially Hamburg, and it is usually served for breakfast, but is also enjoyed along with coffee and cake. As its name indicates, the Franzbrötchen, which literally means French-roll, was probably inspired by French viennoiserie. Originally, it could be found only in the region of Hamburg, but now Franzbrötchen are also sold in Bremen, Berlin, and other German cities.

== Preparation ==
The ingredients of the dough include flour, butter, yeast, milk, sugar, and a pinch of salt, a type of Viennoiserie. The filling is a mixture of sugar and cinnamon. Several times in succession, the dough is folded and rolled out thinly, and coated with butter. As soon as the dough is sufficiently outstretched to a filmy layer, it is moistened with a little water, sprinkled with a melange of sugar and cinnamon and finally rolled up. In order to provide the filled dough roll with the typical shape of a Franzbrötchen, it has to be cut into slices, each about four centimetres thick. Afterwards, the pieces are pressed together in the middle of the cut faces with the handle of a wooden spoon, which causes the filling to ooze out sideways. On baking, the yeast dough rises and the melange of sugar and cinnamon is slightly caramelized on the outside of the layers. Due to the butter and the caramelized sugar, the Franzbrötchen is often a little sticky. Variants of the Franzbrötchen may contain raisins, seeds, chocolate sprinkles or pumpkin seeds.

== Origin ==
During the French occupation (1810–14), Hamburg was pushed to modify its own confectionery tradition as Napoleonic troops wanted local bakers to make traditional croissants. However, the Franzbrötchen is different in appearance and taste than the original pastry and there are two potential explanations for this. One is that the German bakers were accustomed to using heavier dough, and struggled with recreating the softness of French Viennoiserie. Another, more likely reason, is that Hamburg bakers pretended to misunderstand the French request and, as a gesture of “pacifistic rebellion”, supplied “german-style croissants” to enemy soldiers, with the addition of cinnamon.

== See also ==
- List of German desserts
- Cinnamon Roll
