= Pain aux raisins =

French viennoiserie

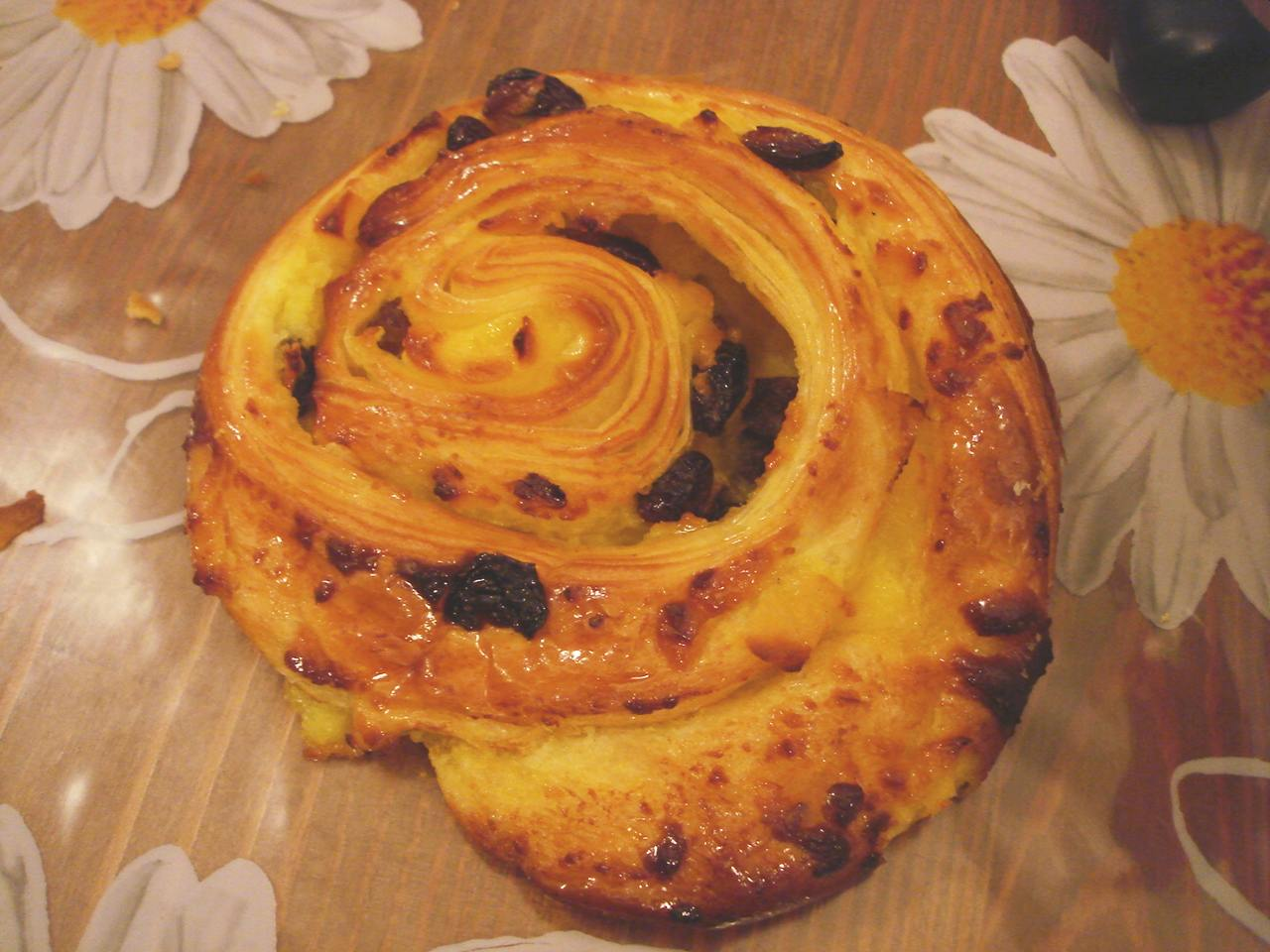
- French style pain aux raisins
- Type: Viennoiserie
- Course: Breakfast
- Place of origin: France
- Main ingredients: Bread, raisins, custard

Pain aux raisins (French pronunciation: [pɛ̃ o ʁɛzɛ̃]), also called escargot (pronounced [ɛskaʁɡo]) or pain russe, is a spiral viennoiserie often eaten for breakfast in France. Its names translate as "raisin bread", "snail" and "Russian bread" respectively.

It is typically a variant of the croissant or pain au chocolat, made with a leavened viennoiserie dough laminated with butter, with raisins added and shaped in a spiral with a crème pâtissière filling. It is often consumed for breakfast as part of a continental breakfast.

In Paris, the name pain aux raisins is also used for a type of raisin bread – a loaf of bread made from wheat or rye and stuffed with raisins.

== See also ==
- Schnecken
- Chelsea bun
- Cinnamon roll
- Danish pastry
