= Bolus (Belgium) =

Belgium viennoiserie

Bolus/Baulus
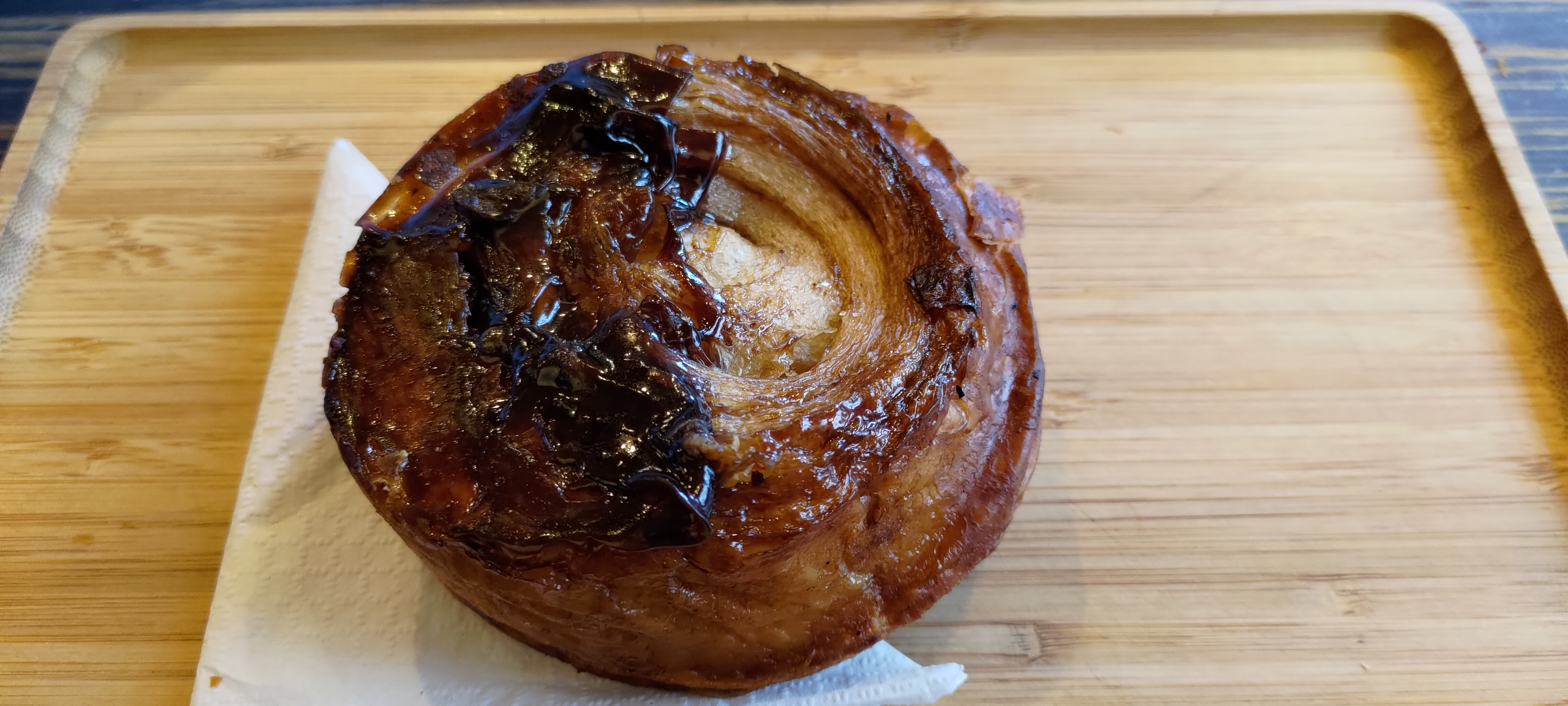
- Type: Viennoiserie
- Course: Breakfast
- Place of origin: Belgium
- Main ingredients: Flour, raisin, milk, butter et cassonade

The bolus or baulus is a brioche-style viennoiserie based on flour, milk, butter, cassonade and raisins, in spiral shape. It is a Belgian and especially Brussels speciality, similar to Zeeuwse bolus but with raisins.
