= Oranais (pastry) =

Apricot pastry

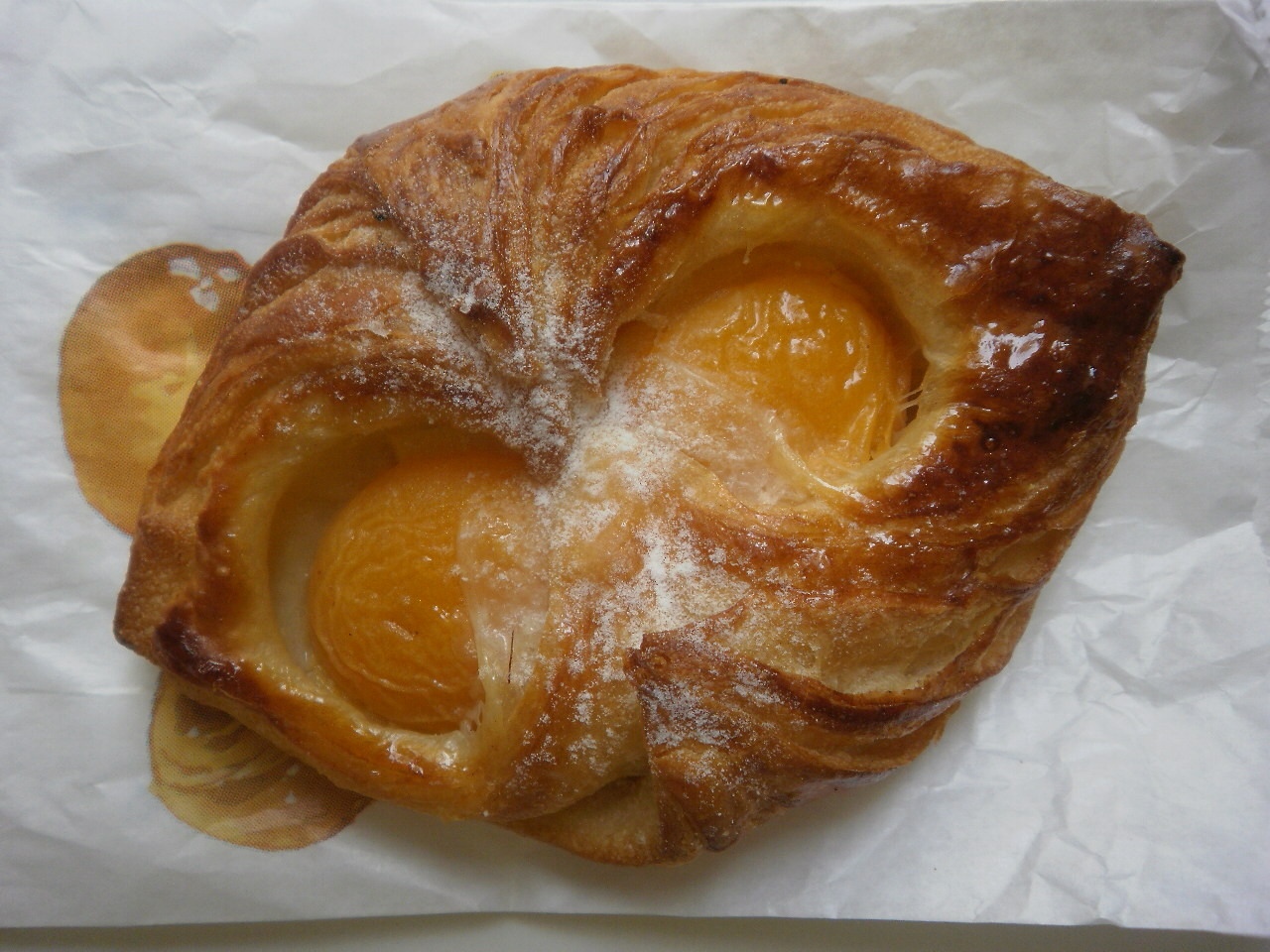
- An oranais pastry
- Type: Viennoiserie
- Place of origin: France
- Main ingredients: Dough, apricots

The oranais is a French viennoiserie made with apricots. The pastry has roots in French Algeria, and is named after the city of Oran, Algeria.

The pastry is often shaped like an oval or a rectangle with folded corners, designed to resemble a pair of eyeglasses, leading to its alternative name, apricot glasses. In France, the pastry is also known as abricotine or apricot croissant.

== History ==
Oran was historically a major center for apricot production. The pastry was created in the 19th century when French colonists introduced crème pâtissière to the region. The resulting pastry, characterized by its signature halved apricots nestled in custard-filled puff pastry, became a staple of Pied-Noir cuisine and remains a popular viennoiserie in both Algeria and France today.
