= Gibassier =

Viennoiserie

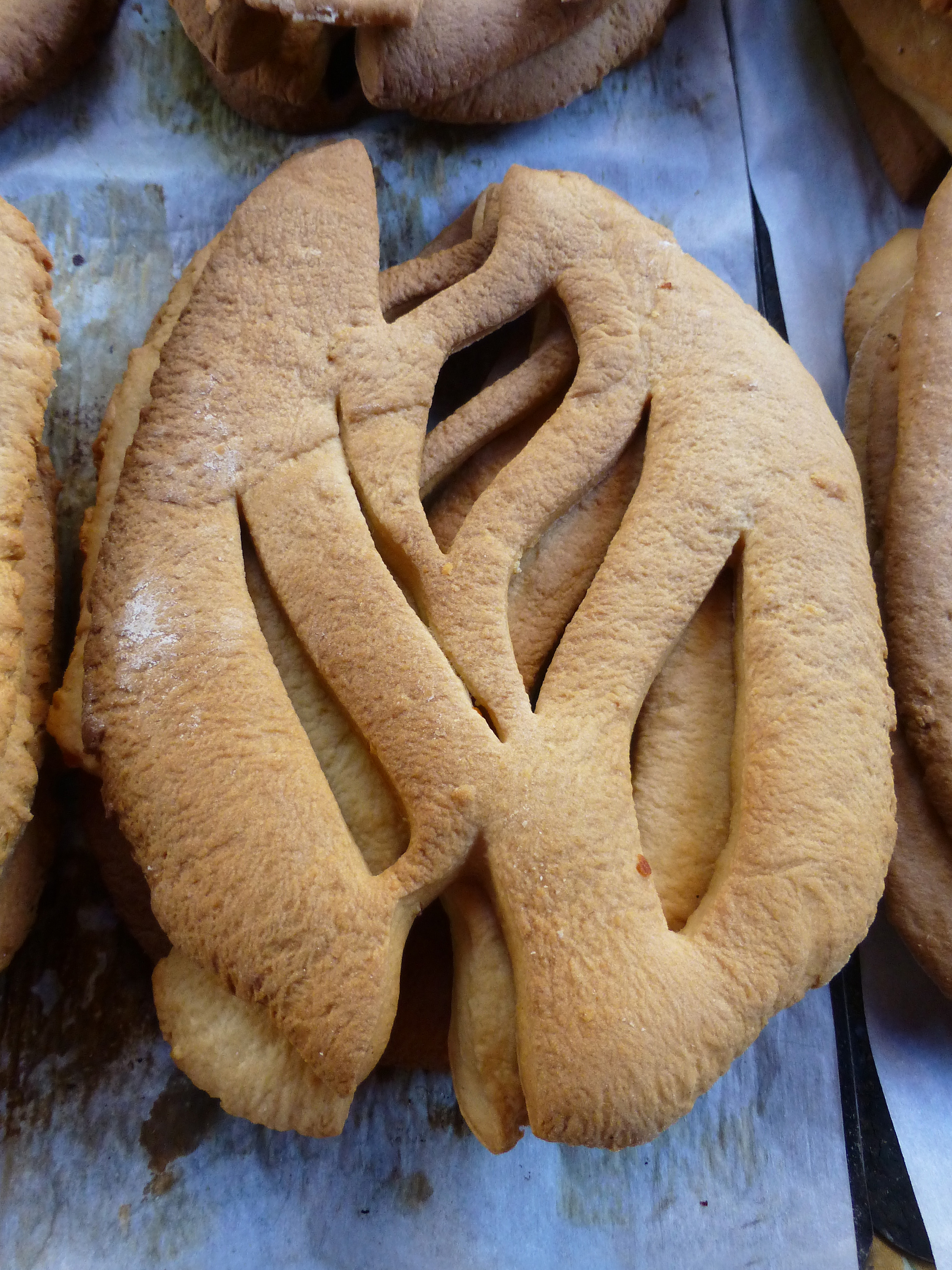
Gibassier made in Lourmarin

A gibassier (pronounced [ʒi.ba.sje]; French: gibassier, Occitan: gibassié, formerly gibacier) is an olive oil-based galette originating in Provence, and a type of viennoiserie. It is generally spiced with anise, candied orange peel, and orange flower water, and dusted with baker's sugar.

== Pompe à l'huile ==
The gibassier is often confused with the pompe à l'huile (pronounced [pɔ̃p alɥil]; Occitan: poumpo à l'oli, pompa a l'òli, literally "oil pump"), but these are distinct dishes. The pompe à l'huile is more moist and is raised. It is part of the thirteen desserts of a Provençal Christmas, which is the only time of year that it is produced whereas the gibassier is drier, pierced with holes, and is a pastry made year-round for everyday consumption. Both replace butter with olive oil as butter is not traditionally used in Provence whereas olive oil is readily found. Moreover, with olive oil, the pastries can be kept longer without drying than with butter.

According to the great dictionary of Occitan Lou Tresor dóu Felibrige, by Frédéric Mistral, the pompe is a « fouace, galette, gâteau que l'on envoie en présent aux fêtes de Noël » (a fouace, airy bread cognate to focaccia, galette, sent as a present on Christmas time) while gibassié is a « gâteau à jour, une galette percée de trous, un craquelin » (a cake, galette pierced with holes, a type of craquelin).

== Availability ==
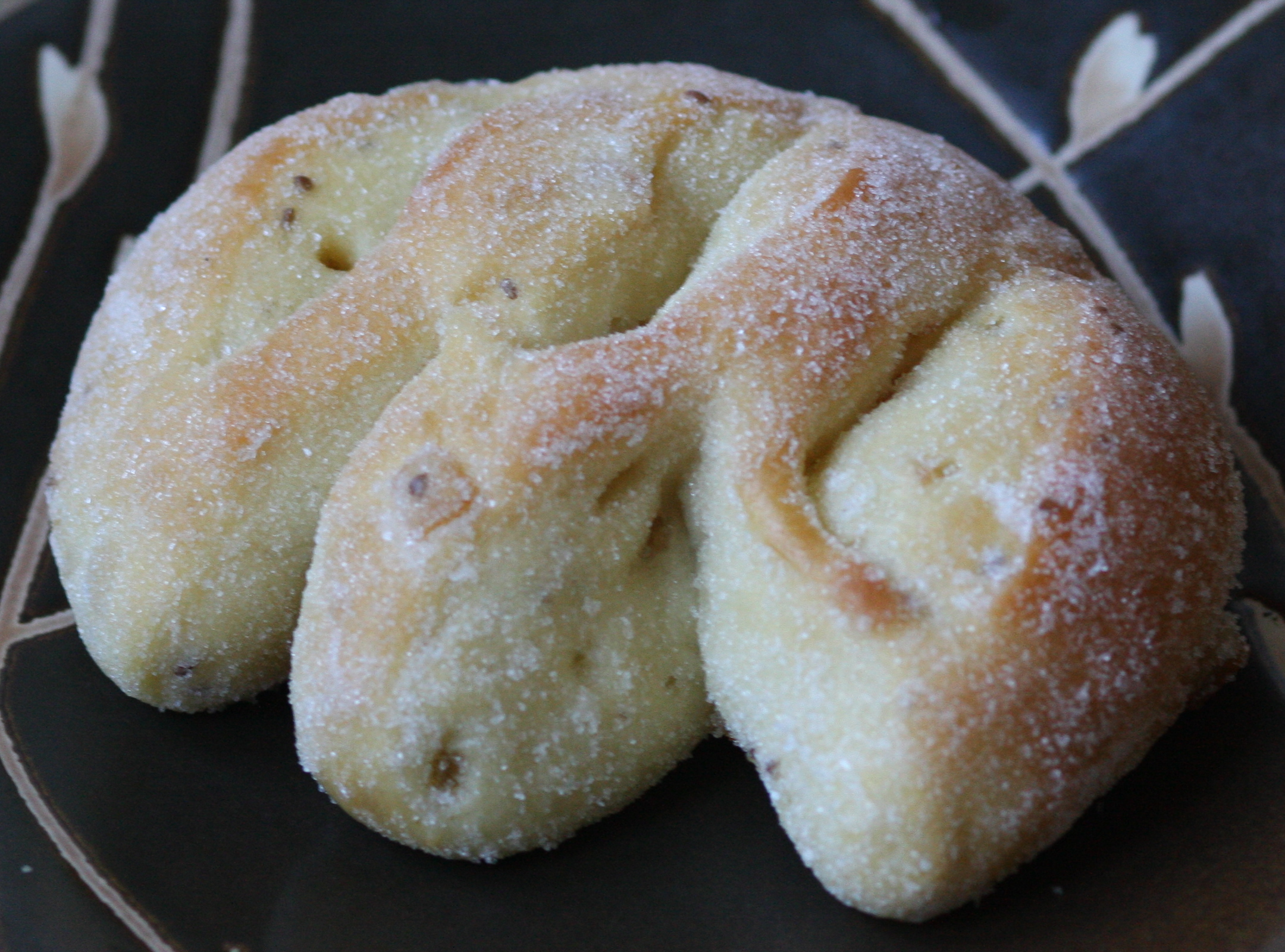
Gibassier made in Oregon

The gibassier is traditional and common in Provence but is rarely available in the English-speaking world.

In the United States, it was popularized in 2002 by Michel Suas (founder of the San Francisco Baking Institute) and Pearl Bakery bread baker, Tim Healea, when he introduced it in the Coupe De Monde competition (World Cup of Bread Baking) held in Paris in which the U.S.A. won the silver medal for bread baking. It continues to be made commercially by Pearl Bakery owned by the Lester family in Portland, Oregon, and hence available at shops around town and local farmers' market. It is also available at Clear Flour Bakery in Brookline, MA.

In addition, Midwife & the Baker, in California's Bay Area produces their version seasonally, usually making it available sometime during the months of November, December, and January.

== Etymology ==
The etymology is unclear – see gibassier. Some suggest that it is named after the mountain peak Le Gibas in the Luberon mountains. Alternatively, the old form gibacier is also a flat bag, used to carry game (from the French word for game, gibier, from Latin); these words may be homophones, or the origin, the pastry having a similar shape to the bag.

== Variation ==
As a traditional dish, there is significant variation between preparations (compare bouillabaisse). A more unusual variation is to prepare it as a hard biscuit (cookie), rather than as a cake, but with the same pierced shape. This is a specialty of Lourmarin.
