= Orange flower water =

Clear, perfumed distillation of fresh bitter-orange blossoms

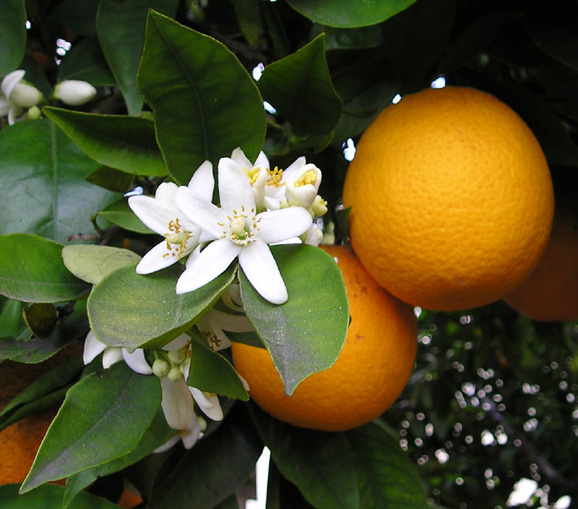
Orange flower

Orange flower water or orange blossom water is a clear aromatic by-product of the distillation of fresh bitter-orange blossoms for their essential oil.

== Extraction ==
Orange flower water is the product of steam distillation of orange blossoms.

Various essential oil products extracted from components of an orange tree (image adapted from Techniques for Oil Extraction

== Uses ==
This essential water has traditionally been used as an aromatizer in many Mediterranean traditional dessert dishes, such as in France for the gibassier and pompe à l'huile or in Spain for the Roscón de Reyes (King cake), or in Italy for the pastiera, or the Samsa in Algeria and Tunisia or in Moroccan coffee, but has more recently found its way into other cuisines. For example, orange flower water is used in Europe to flavor madeleines, in Mexico to flavor little wedding cakes and pan de muerto, and in the United States to make orange blossom scones and marshmallows. Orange flower water is also used as an ingredient in some cocktails, such as the Ramos Gin Fizz. In Malta and many North African as well as Middle Eastern countries, orange blossom water is widely used as medicine for stomach ache and given to small children as well as adults. Some cultures have also used it to treat anxiety.

Orange flower water has been a traditional ingredient used often in North African as well as in Middle Eastern cooking. In Arab variants of baklava, orange blossom water is often mixed with the sweet syrup for flavor. Orange blossoms are believed to be used in this manner because they are seen as the traditional bridal flower and, therefore, symbolize purity (white, small and delicate). It is also added to plain water in the Middle East to mask high mineral content and other unpleasant flavors (for example, those arising from storage in a qulla (قلة), a type of clay jug that keeps water cool in a manner similar to the zeer); some add the fragrance irrespective of the taste of the plain water.

Orange blossom water serves two purposes in the Maghreb: one usage is as a perfume or freshener, usually given to guests to wash their hands upon entering the host's house or before drinking tea. It is put in a special silver or metal container, recognizable in the typical Maghrebi tea set. This old custom is fading away. It is still common in Algerian cuisine, Tunisian cuisine, and Moroccan cuisine, especially as an ingredient for traditional sweets and sometimes to aromatize drinks such as coffee. In Algeria, orange blossom water is also used to reduce the sensation of heat and to soothe sunburns, especially when applied to the head as a cooling remedy. In Argentina, which borrows a lot of culinary traditions from Italy, agua de azahar is used to add a particular aroma and flavor to pan dulce, the traditional panettone prepared during year end celebrations.

== Names ==
In Greece and Cyprus orange blossom water is called anthonero (ανθόνερο) while in Malta it is known as ilma żahar.

In the Levant, orange blossom water is known as may zahr (مي زهر), and ma zhar (ما زهر), in the North African dialects of Morocco, Algeria, and Tunisia meaning "orange blossom water", in contrast to may ward (مي ورد) or ilma ward (الما ورد), which is rose water.

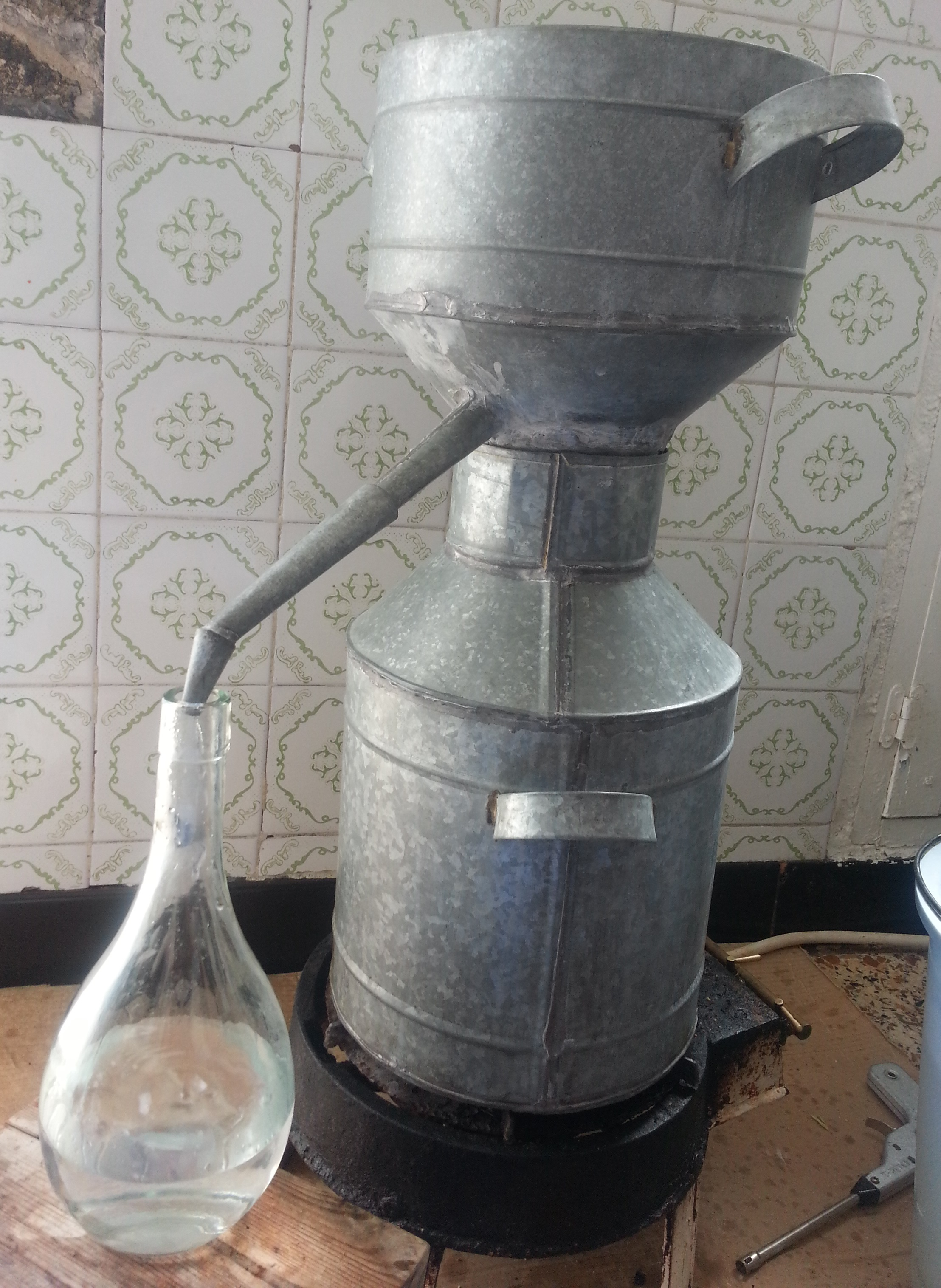
Antique refining barrel of orange tree flowers

== See also ==
- Neroli
- Orange (fruit)
