= Tebirkes =

Danish pastry

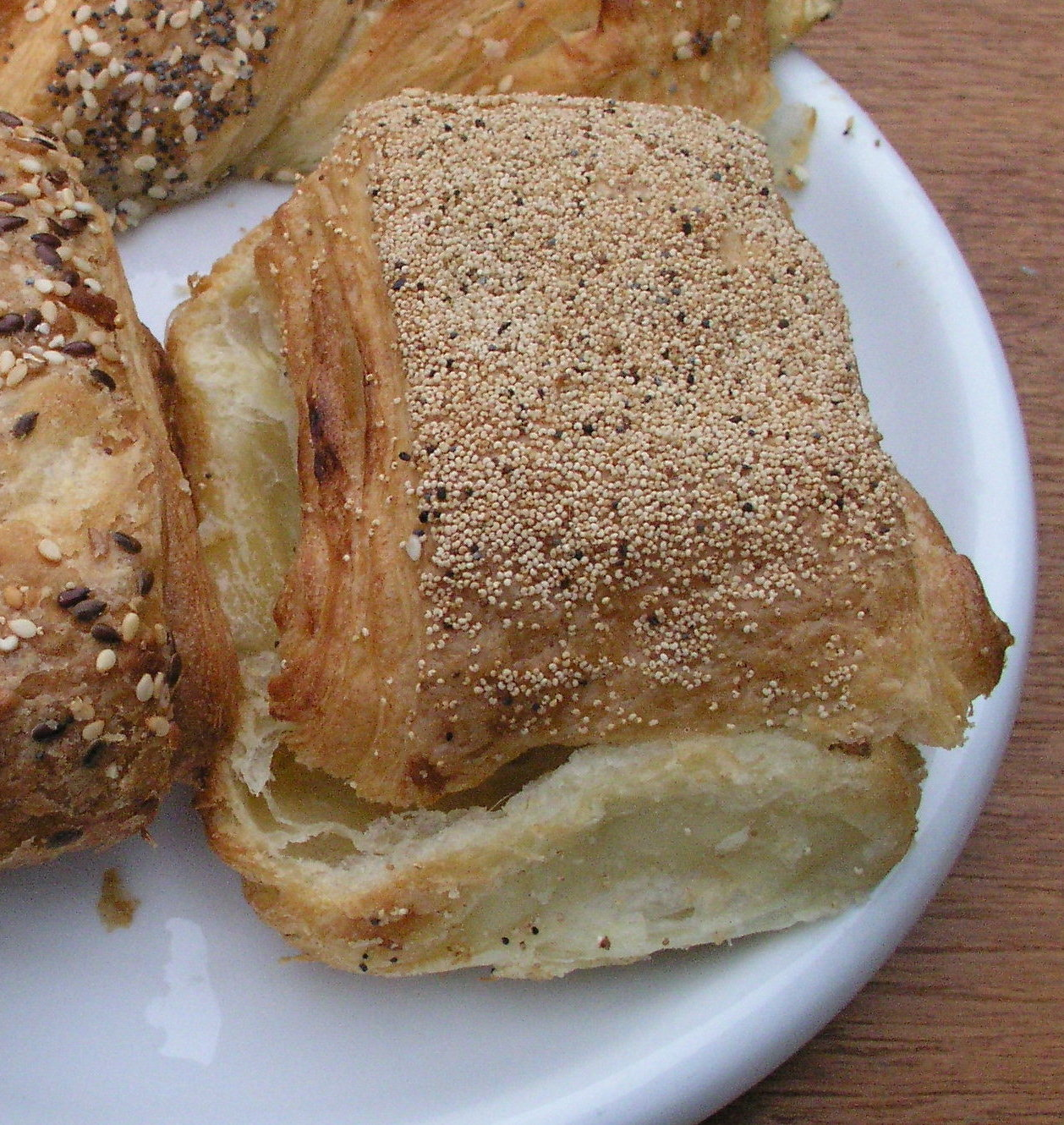
- Alternative names: thebirkes, københavnerbirkes, grovbirkes
- Type: Viennoiserie
- Place of origin: Denmark
- Main ingredients: flour, butter, milk, white sugar, yeast, eggs, marzipan, poppy seeds

Tebirkes (sometimes thebirkes, københavnerbirkes, or grovbirkes) is a traditional sweet Viennoiserie originating from Denmark. It is made with two layers of yeast leavened laminated dough sandwiching a layer of marzipan filling and topped with poppy seeds.

== History ==
The name "Tebirkes" comes from the Danish words "te" meaning tea and "birkes" meaning poppy seeds.

The origin of Tebirkes is Austrian and dates back to the 18th and 19th centuries, even though the name refers to Denmark. The pastry was introduced to Denmark by Austrian bakers who came to work in Copenhagen in the late 1800s. Over time, Danish bakers adapted the recipe and added their own twist by incorporating marzipan filling and poppy seeds on top. Tebirkes is a popular pastry in Denmark and can be found in most bakeries throughout the country.

== Preparation ==
The pastry is usually made with milk, sugar, salt, flour, yeast, eggs, and butter. The dough is made by rolling out laminated dough and folding it several times to create layers.

== Variations ==
There are different variations of Tebirkes in Denmark. The traditional filling is remonce, a mixture of sugar, butter, and either nuts or marzipan. However, jam, custard, and fruit can also be used as a filling. There are also different types of Tebirkes; according to Scandinavia Standard the ones filled with remonce are "undoubtedly the most popular".
