= Pain suisse =

French pastry

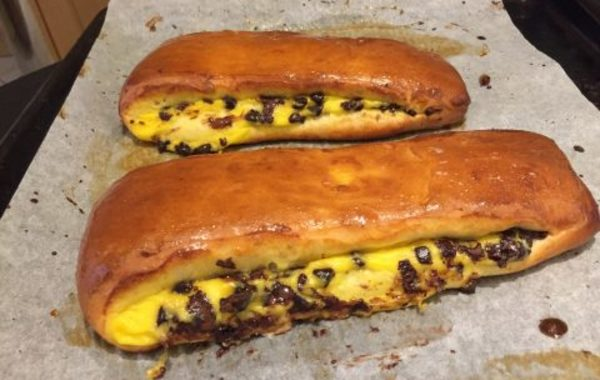
- Type: Viennoiserie
- Place of origin: France
- Main ingredients: Dough, pastry cream, chocolate chips
- Variations: Africain

Pain suisse (French pronunciation: [pɛ̃ sɥis]) is a French viennoiserie made with viennoiserie dough filled with vanilla pastry cream and chocolate chips. Its name translate as "Swiss bread" although it originated in France and is not common in Switzerland.

A chocolate-covered variation, sometimes known as the africain, is also sold in France. The original is especially common in the Valenciennes region of northern France.

== See also ==
- Couque suisse
