= Thirteen desserts =

Traditional Christmas food in Provence, France

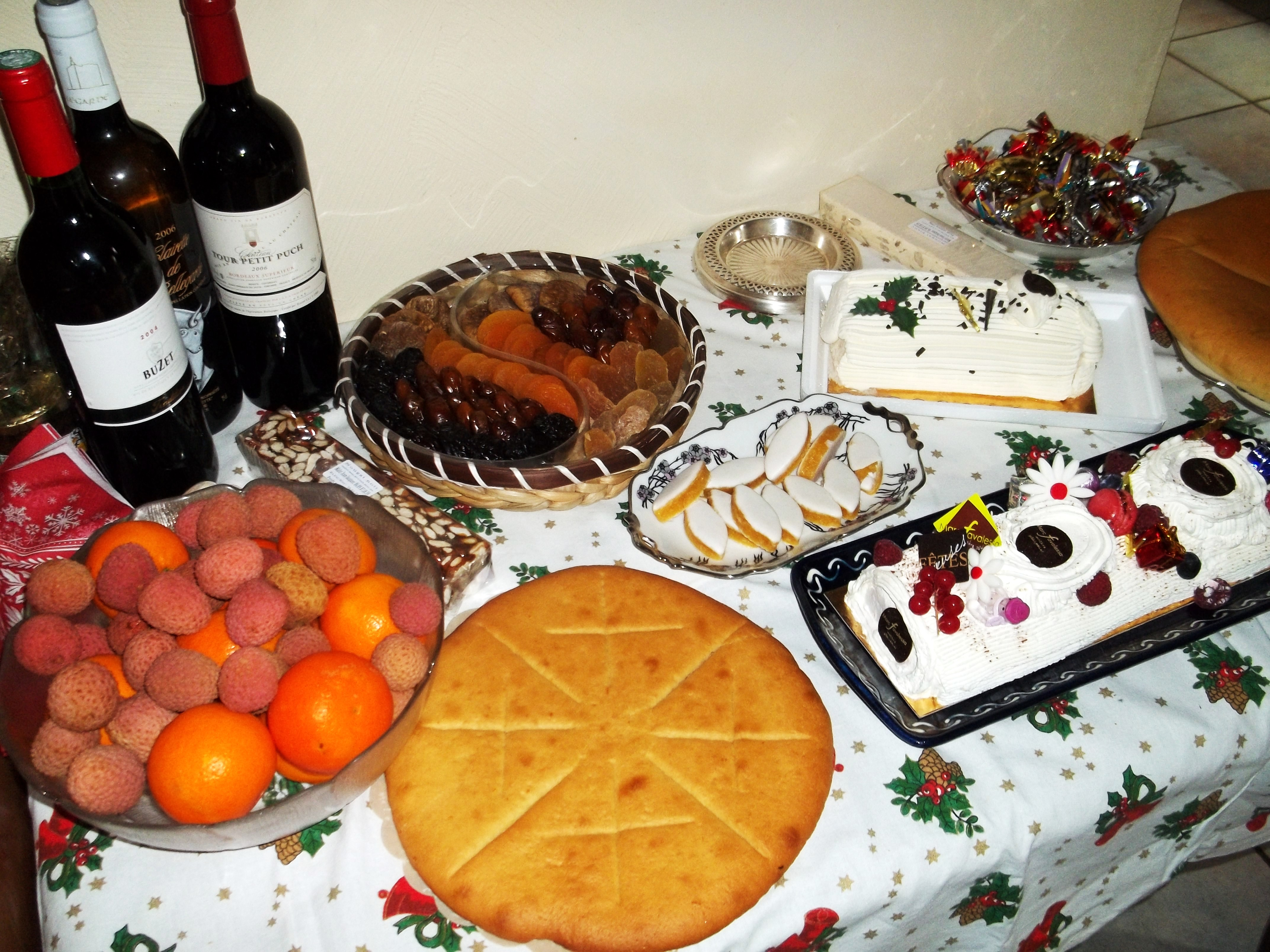
The thirteen desserts in the Provence

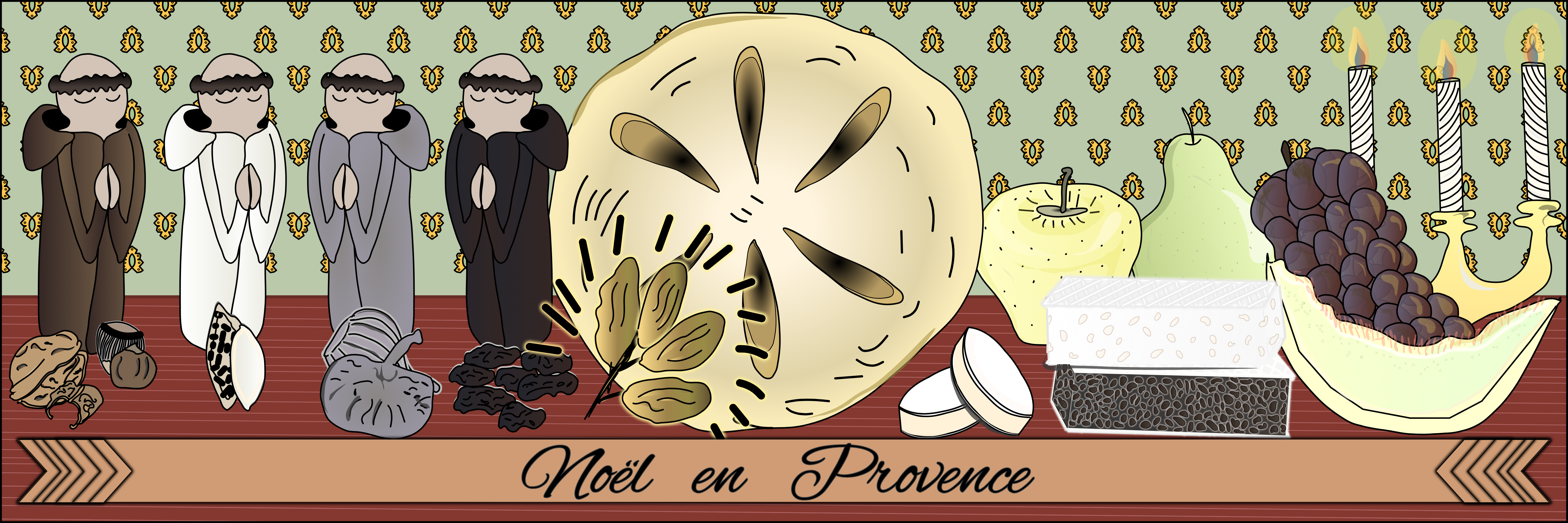
Les 13 desserts de la tradition de Noël en Provence

The thirteen desserts (Occitan: lei tretze dessèrts) are the traditional dessert foods used to celebrate Christmas in the French region of Provence. The "big supper" (le gros souper) ends with a ritual 13 desserts, representing Jesus Christ and the 12 apostles. The desserts always number thirteen but the exact items vary by local or familial tradition. The food traditionally is set out Christmas Eve and remains on the table three days until December 27.

== Dried fruit and nuts ==
The first four of these are known as the "four beggars" (les quatre mendiants), representing the four mendicant monastic orders: Dominicans, Franciscans, Augustinians and Carmelites.

- Raisins (Dominicans)
- Walnuts or hazelnuts (Augustinians)
- Dried figs (Franciscans)
- Almonds (Carmelites)
- Dates, representing the foods of the region where Christ lived and died
- Dried plums from Brignoles

== Fresh fruit ==
- Apples
- Pears
- Oranges
- Winter melon
- Grapes
- Tangerines

== Sweets ==
- Biscotins (biscuits) from Aix;
- Calissons d'Aix, a marzipan-like candy made from almond paste and candied melon.
- Candied citron
- Casse-dents of Allauch (biscuit)
- Cumin and fennel seed biscuits
- Fried bugnes
- Fruit tourtes
- Oreillettes, light thin waffles
- Pain d'epices
- Pompes à l'huile or fougasse à l'huile d'olive, a sweet cake or brioche made with orange flower water and olive oil
- Quince cheese/quince paste (Pâte de coing)
- Yule log
- Two kinds of nougat, symbolizing good and evil
  - Black nougat with honey (Nougat noir au miel), a hard candy made with honey and almonds
  - White nougat (Nougat blanc), a soft candy made with sugar, eggs, pistachios, honey, and almonds

== French wedding foodways ==
Bayle St. John, writing in The Purple Tints of Paris (vol. 2) "The dishes are substantial; soup, boiled beef, veal, salad, cheese, apples, and what are called, for some mysterious reason, the four beggars — nuts, figs, almonds, and raisins, mixed together."

== See also ==
- List of desserts
