= Craquelin =

Food

Craquelin is a type of Belgian brioche, a Viennoiserie, that is filled with nib sugar. Sugar pieces are flavoured with orange, lemon, vanilla, or almond essence, then inserted into the dough before cooking. They melt and cool, leaving gaps encrusted in sugar. The craquelin dough will have a viennoiserie dough overlay to prevent sugar protrusion.

== See also ==
- Craquelin (Bretagne)
- Amplang
- Amaretti di Saronno
- Ballokume
- Cornish fairing
- Qurabiya
