= Viennoiserie =

Type of baked goods and dough

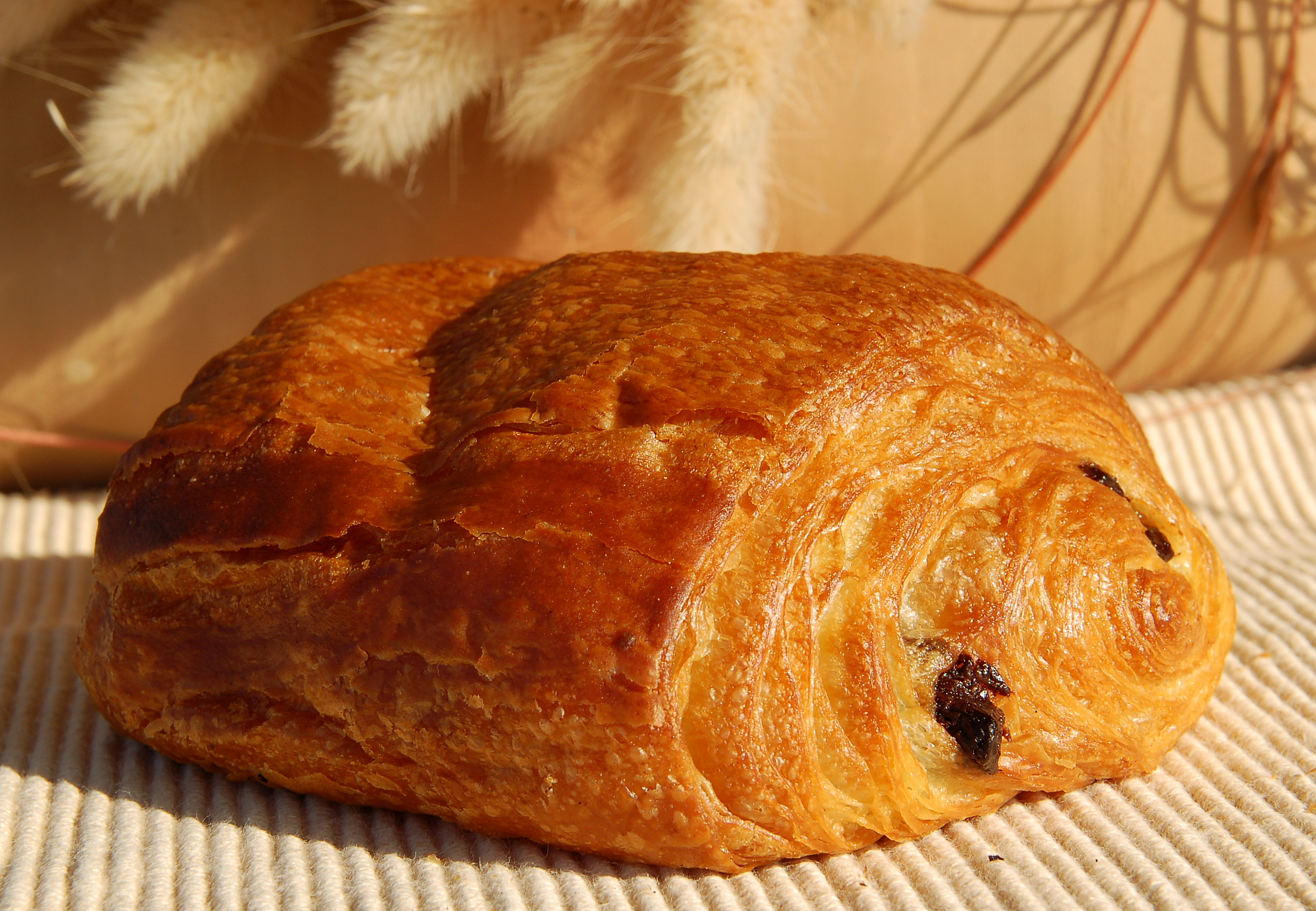
- Pain au chocolat, a type of viennoiserie
- Course: Breakfast or snack or dessert
- Place of origin: France
- Main ingredients: Varies by type

Viennoiserie (French: [vjɛnwazʁi]; English: "things in the style of Vienna") is a yeast-leavened dough, as well as an overarching name for the products made with it, that are at a meeting point between bread and pastry, which was described by the Dictionnaire Petit Robert as neither a pastry nor a bread. The dough is sweetened with sugar and enriched with butter, eggs, milk or a combination of the three. There are two classes of viennoiserie: non-laminated dough products include brioche, pandoro, and gibassier, while laminated dough products include croissant and Danish pastry. Viennoiseries are typically eaten at breakfast or as snacks.

== History ==
The popularity of Viennese-style baked goods in France began with the boulangerie Viennoise, which was opened by Austrian August Zang in 1839. The first usage of the expression pâtisseries viennoises appeared in 1877 in a novel by the French author Alphonse Daudet, Le Nabab.

== Types ==
There are two types of viennoiserie: non-laminated and laminated in their manufacturing. The processes to create the dough are slightly different:

Laminated	Non-laminated
Pre-ferment	Pre-ferment
Mixing	Mixing
First fermentation	First fermentation
Lamination	
Dividing	Dividing
	Pre-shaping
Relaxation of the dough	Resting time
Shaping	Shaping
Final proof	Final proof
Baking	Baking
Cooling	Cooling

== Styles of viennoiserie ==
Some cinnamon roll recipes use this type of dough.

Name	Image	Country of origin
Babka		Poland
Bear claw		United States
Bolus		Belgium
Brioche		France
Carre rhubarbe		France
Chausson au citron		France
Chausson aux pommes		France
Cougnou		Belgium / Netherlands
Craquelin		Belgium
Cream de parisienne		France
Cremeux Passoã		France
Croissant		France
Croustillants au caramel		France
Cruffin		Australia
Danish pastry		Denmark
Feuilleté nougat framboise		France
Franzbrötchen		Germany
Gibassier		France
Kouglof	France	
Kouign-amann		France
Les carrés du goûter		France
Le noisetier		France
Lingot poire caramel		France
Medialunas		Argentina
New York roll		United States
Oranais		French Algeria
Pandoro		Italy
Pain au chocolat, or chocolatine		France
Pain au lait		France
Pain aux raisins		France
Pain suisse		France
Roule au caramel		France
St. Martin's croissant		Poland
Torsades praline		France
Vienna bread		Austria
Tebirkes		Denmark
Xuixo		Spain

== See also ==
- List of French desserts
- List of baked goods
- Beignet
