= Cougnou =

Bread baked during Christmas time

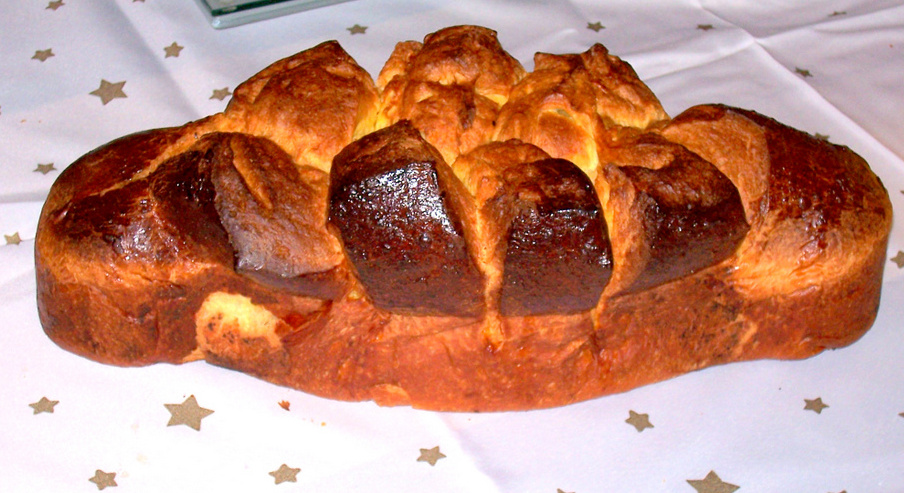
- A quéniole of Valenciennes
- Alternative names: Bread of Jesus, coquille, cougnolle, folards, quéniolle, volaeren
- Type: Viennoiserie/ Sweet bread
- Place of origin: Low Countries
- Main ingredients: Flour, eggs, milk, yeast, raisins, sugar

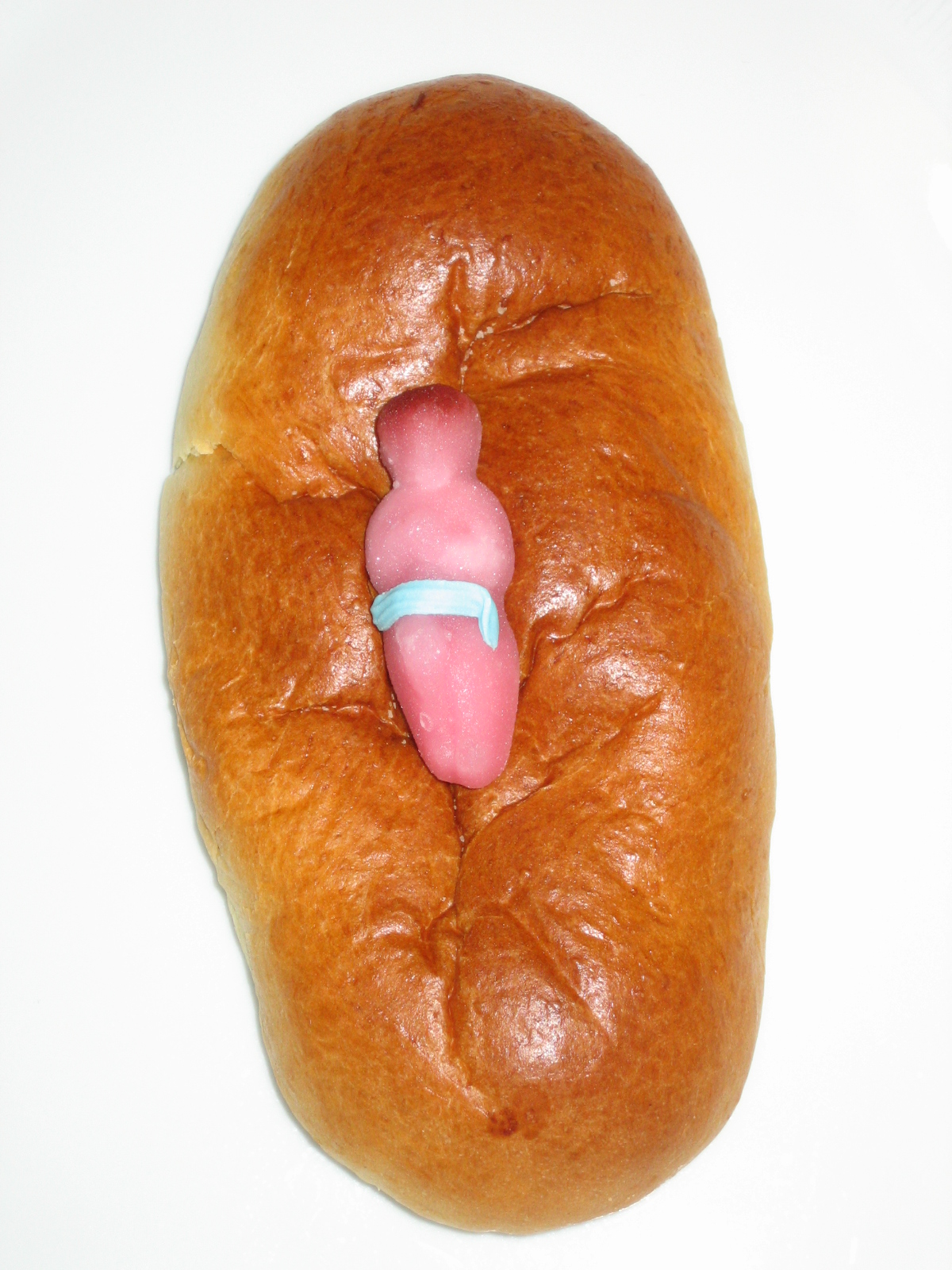
A cougnou

The cougnou or bread of Jesus is a Viennoiserie baked during Christmas time and is typical of the southern Low Countries.

It has various names according to the location:

- coquille in Romance Flanders (Lille and Tournai)
- cougnolle or similar in ancient Hainaut (cognolle in Mons)
- cougnou in Walloon-speaking places like Charleroi, Andenne, Namur, Dinant but also in Ardennes, in the Gaume, and in Brussels
- quéniolle in Cambraisis
- volaeren, folards or folarts in West Flemish-speaking French Flanders like Dunkirk

The bread of Jesus is a sweet bread formed like a baby Jesus. It is made with flour, eggs, milk, yeast, raisins and sugar. Usually, it is given to children on Christmas and St. Martin's Day and usually eaten with a cup of hot chocolate. This bread seems to have originated in ancient Hainaut but it is now spread throughout the southern Low Countries. It is usually decorated with terracotta circles called ronds in Hainaut and Romance Flanders, or with incisions in Cambraisis. Elsewhere the bread is decorated with flowers, sugar, raisins, or chocolate chips.

== See also ==
- King cake
- Panettone
- Stollen
- Stutenkerl
- Yule log
