= Pita =

Yeast-leavened flatbread baked from wheat flour

Pita bread
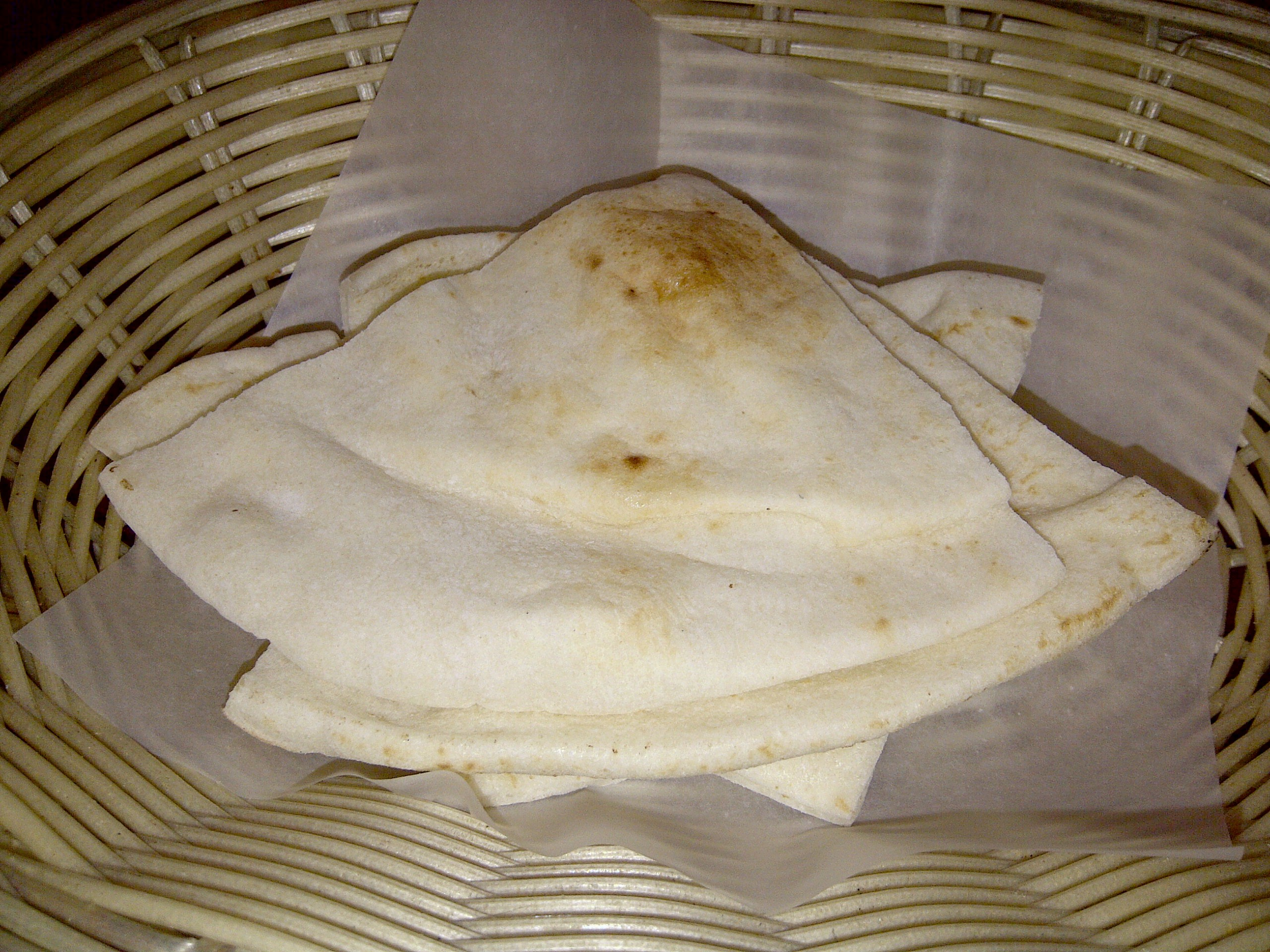
- Pita from Lebanon
- Alternative names: Pide, khubz
- Type: Flatbread
- Region or state: Eastern Mediterranean, Middle East and North Africa
- Main ingredients: Wheat flour, water, yeast, salt

Pita (/ˈpɪtə/ or US: /ˈpiːtə/; Greek: πίτα; Hebrew: פִּיתָּה) or pitta (British English), also known as Greek bread (Greek: Ελληνικό ψωμί, romanized: Ellinikó psomí), Arabic bread, Arab bread (Arabic: خبز عربي, romanized: khubz ʿArabī), Syrian bread, Lebanese bread, and pocket bread, is a family of yeast-leavened round flatbreads baked from wheat flour, common in the Mediterranean, Middle East, and neighboring areas. It includes the widely known version with an interior pocket. In the United Kingdom, the term is used for pocket versions such as the Greek pita, used for barbecues as a souvlaki wrap. The Western name pita may sometimes be used to refer to various other types of flatbreads that have different names in their local languages, such as numerous styles of Arab khubz ('bread').

== Etymology ==
The first mention of the word in English cited in the Oxford English Dictionary was in 1936. The English word is borrowed from Modern Greek πίτα (píta, 'bread, cake, pie'), in turn from Byzantine Greek (attested in 1108), possibly from Ancient Greek πίττα (pítta) or πίσσα (píssa), both meaning 'pitch/resin', or from πικτή (piktḗ, 'fermented pastry'), which may have passed to Latin as picta cf. pizza. Other hypotheses trace the Greek word back to the Classical Hebrew word פת (patt, lit. 'a morsel of bread'). It is spelled like the Aramaic פיתא (pittā), from which it was received into Byzantine Greek (see above). Hypotheses also exist for Germanic or Illyrian intermediaries.

Some say that English borrowed the word directly from Modern Hebrew, which had revived the Aramaic term in the preceding decades. However, native Modern Hebrew nouns are characterized by final stress.

The word has been borrowed by the Turkish language as pide, and appears in the Balkan languages as Bosnian-Serbian-Croatian pita, Romanian pită, Albanian pite, and Bulgarian pitka or pita; however, in the Serbo-Croatian languages of the countries comprising the former Yugoslavia, the word pita is used in a general sense meaning pie.

In Arabic, the phrase خبز البيتا (khabaz albayta, lit. 'pita bread') is sometimes used; other names are simply خبز (khubz, 'bread'), الخبز العربي (al-khubz al-ʿarabiyy, 'Arab bread') or خبز الكماج (khabaz al-kimaj, 'al-kimaj bread'). In Egypt, it is called eish baladi (عيش بلدي ʽēš baladi) or simply eish (عيش ʽēš, 'bread'), although other subtypes of "bread" are common in Egypt, such as eish fino and eish merahrah.

In Greek, pita (πίτα) is understood by default to refer to the thicker, pocketless Greek pita, whereas the thinner khubz-style pita is referred to as aravikí pita (αραβική πίτα, lit. 'Arabic pastry').

== History ==
Pita has roots in the prehistoric flatbreads of the Near East. There is evidence from about 14,500 years ago, during the Stone Age, that the Natufian people in what is now Jordan made a kind of flatbread from wild cereal grains. Ancient wheat and barley were among the earliest domesticated crops in the Neolithic period of about 10,000 years ago, in the Fertile Crescent. By 4,000 years ago, bread was of central importance in societies such as the Babylonian culture of Mesopotamia, where the earliest-known written records and recipes of bread-making originate, and where pita-like flatbreads cooked in a tinûru (tannur or tandoor) were a basic element of the diet, and much the same as today's tandoor bread, taboon bread, and laffa, an Iraqi flatbread with many similarities with pita. However, there is no record of the steam-puffed, two-layer "pocket pita" in the ancient texts, or in any of the medieval Arab cookbooks, and according to food historians such as Charles Perry and Gil Marks it was likely a later development.

== Preparation ==
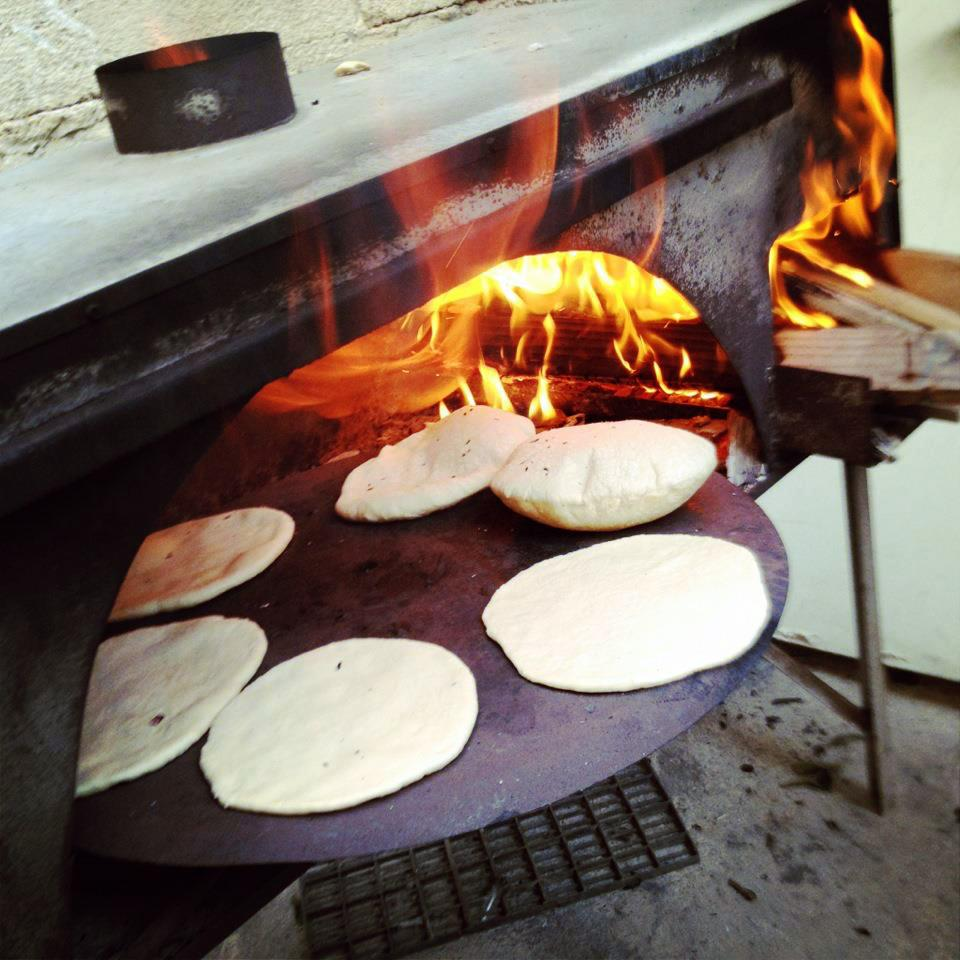
Pita baking in Nazareth

Most pita breads are baked at high temperatures (230–245 °C or 450–475 °F), which turn the water in the dough into steam, thus causing the pita to puff up and form a pocket. When removed from the oven, the layers of baked dough remain separated inside the deflated pita, which allows the bread to be opened to form a pocket. However, pita is sometimes baked without pockets and is called "pocket-less pita". Pita is traditionally served fresh from the oven (typically a wood-fired oven similar to a pizza oven). It is best either soon after baking or on the same day, and can be served warm.

Modern commercial pita bread is prepared on advanced automatic production lines, processing 45,000-kilogram (100,000 lb) silos of flour at a time and producing thousands of pitas per hour. The ovens used in commercial baking are much hotter than traditional clay ovens—430–480 °C (800–900 °F)—so each pita is baked only for one minute. The pita are then air-cooled for about 20 minutes on conveyor belts before being shipped immediately or else stored in commercial freezers kept at a temperature of −12 °C (10 °F).

== Culinary use ==
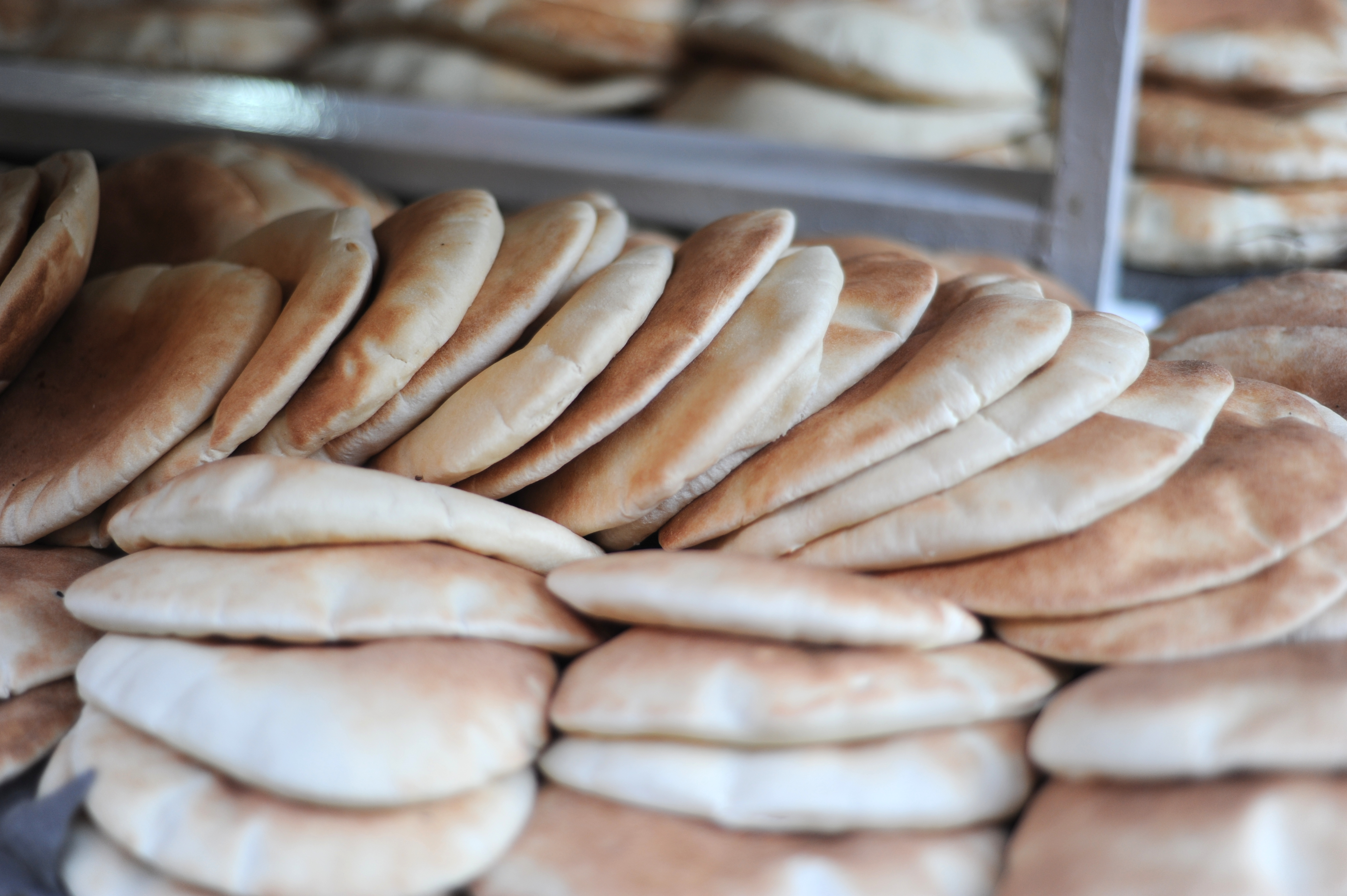
Pita bread at a souq in Nablus.

Pita can be used to scoop sauces or dips, such as hummus, or to wrap kebabs, gyros, sabich, or falafel in the manner of sandwiches. It can also be cut and baked into crispy pita chips.

In Turkish cuisine, the word pide may refer to three different styles of bread: a flatbread similar to that eaten in Greece and Arab countries, a pizza-like dish, içli pide, where the filling is placed on the (often boat-shaped) dough before baking, and Ramazan pidesi. The first type of pide is used to wrap various styles of kebab, while the second is topped with cheese, ground meat, or other fresh or cured meats, and/or vegetables. Regional variations in the shape, baking technique, and toppings create distinctive styles for each region.

In Cyprus, pita is typically rounder, fluffier, and baked on a cast-iron skillet. It is used for souvlakia, sheftalia, halloumi with lountza, and gyros. In Greece the word pita means "pastry" and is usually used for various cakes and pastries like spanakopita (spinach pie) and karydopita (walnut cake) unrelated to the English language "pita" flatbread. Traditional breads in Greek cuisine are leavened loaves, such as the round καρβέλι karvéli or the oblong φραντζόλα frantzóla. This style of pita flatbread, in the English language meaning of the word, is almost exclusively used as a wrap for souvlaki or gyros usually garnished with some combination of tzatziki sauce, tomatoes, onions, and french fries.

Druze pita is filled with labneh (thick yoghurt) and topped with olive oil and za'atar.

In Bosnia, Croatia, Bulgaria, and Serbia, the local style of pita is known as lepinja, somun, purlenka, or pitica, and is the most common bread served with barbecued food like ćevapi, pljeskavica, kebapche, or grilled sausages. The word pita itself, on the other hand, is used for pie in the general sense in all local languages, and is mostly used for börek or various sweet phyllo pastry dishes (with the exception of baklava which is always called that).

Pita is also present in the cuisine of the Aromanians.

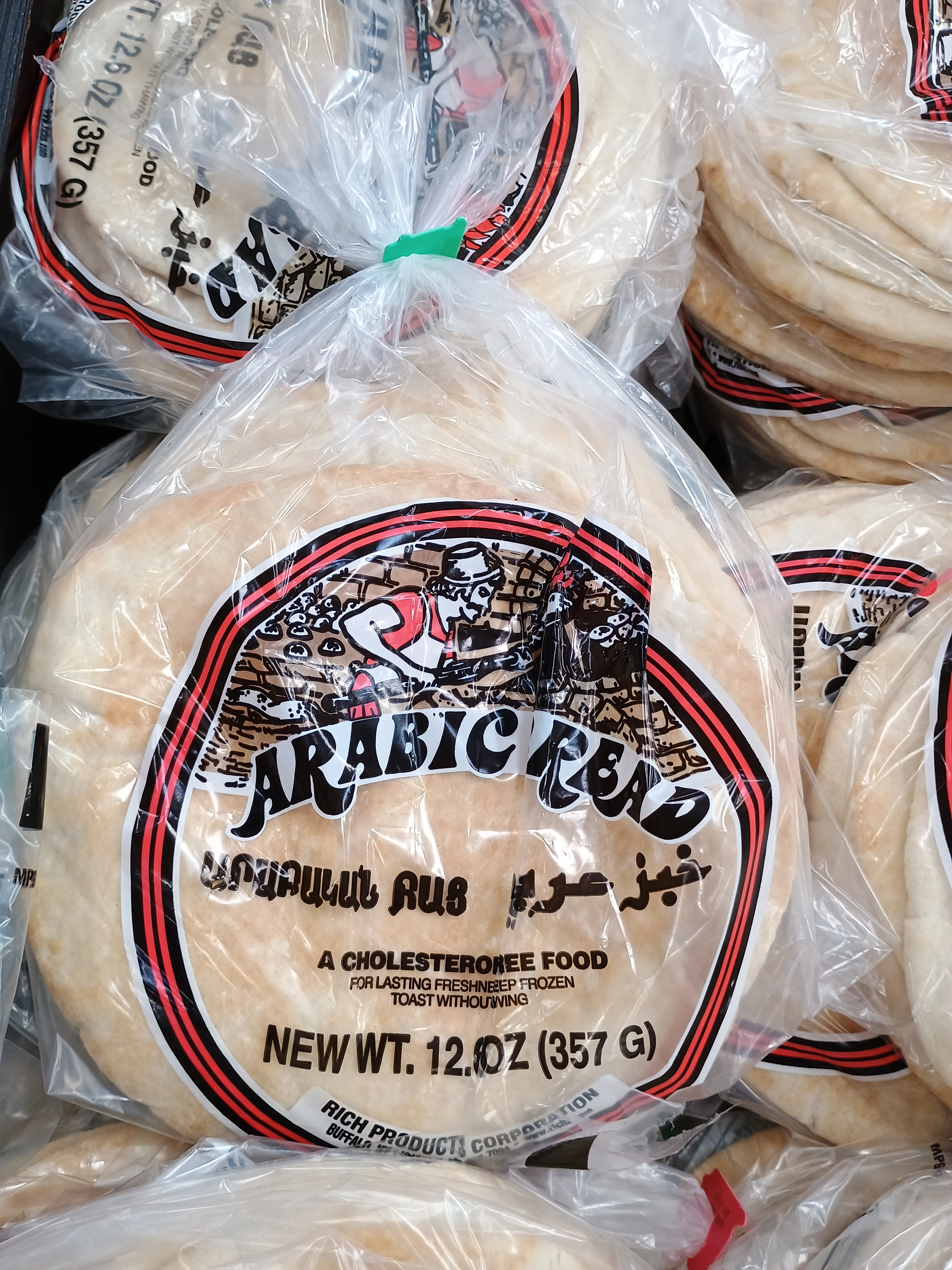
Arabic bread package in US with English, Armenian and Arabic text

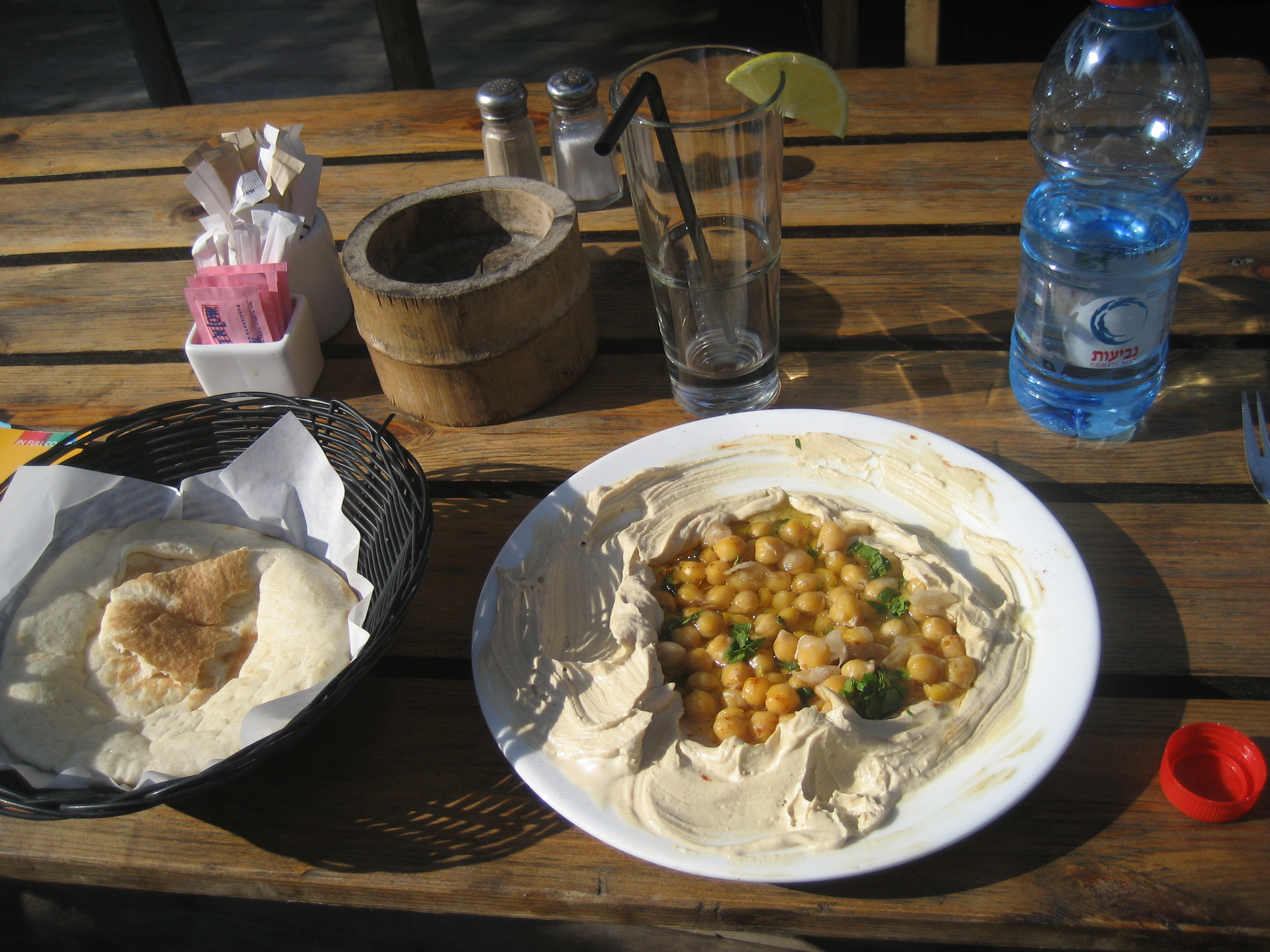
Hummus platter served with pita in Tel Aviv

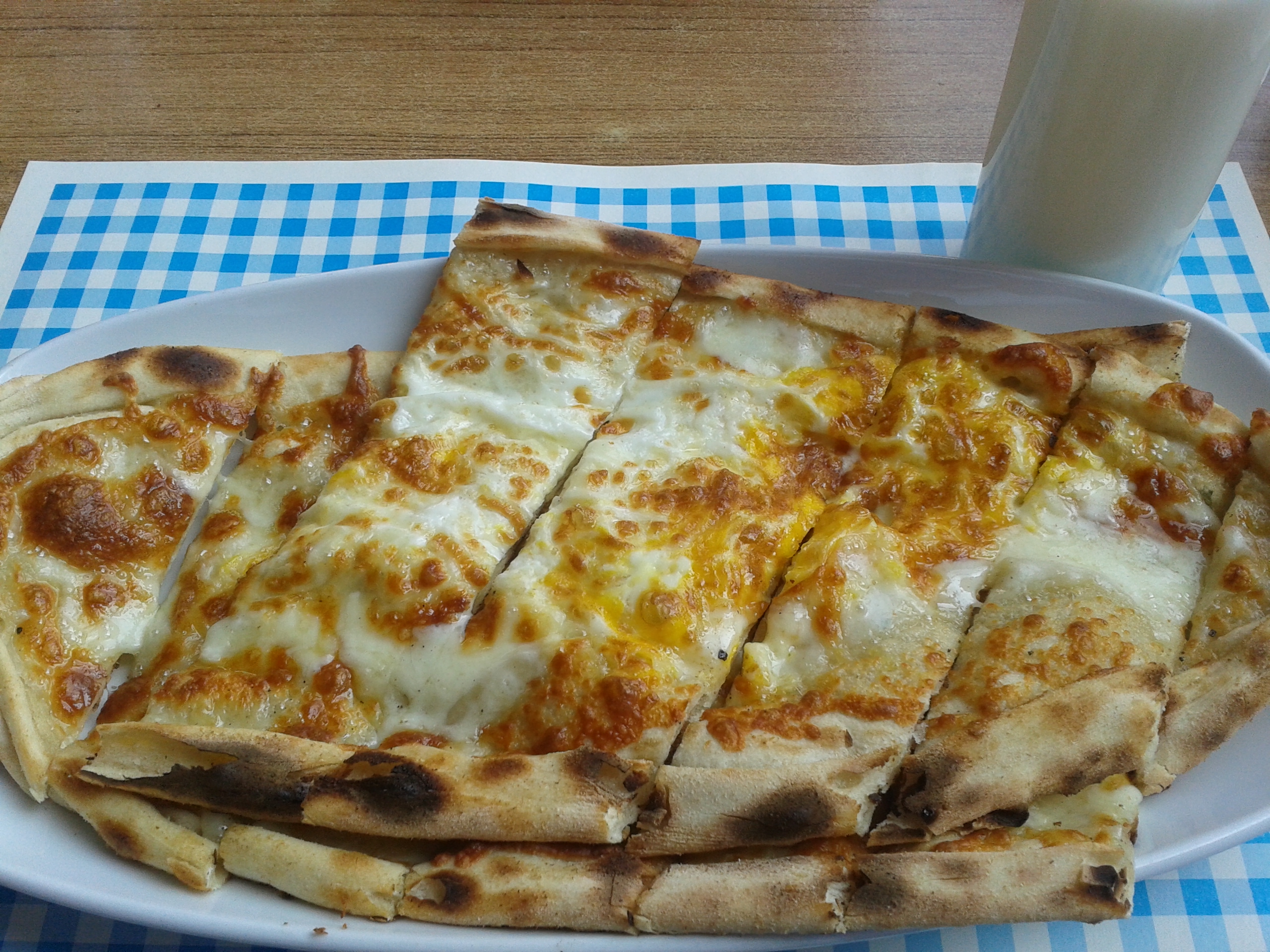
Karadeniz pidesi from Turkey topped with kaşar cheese

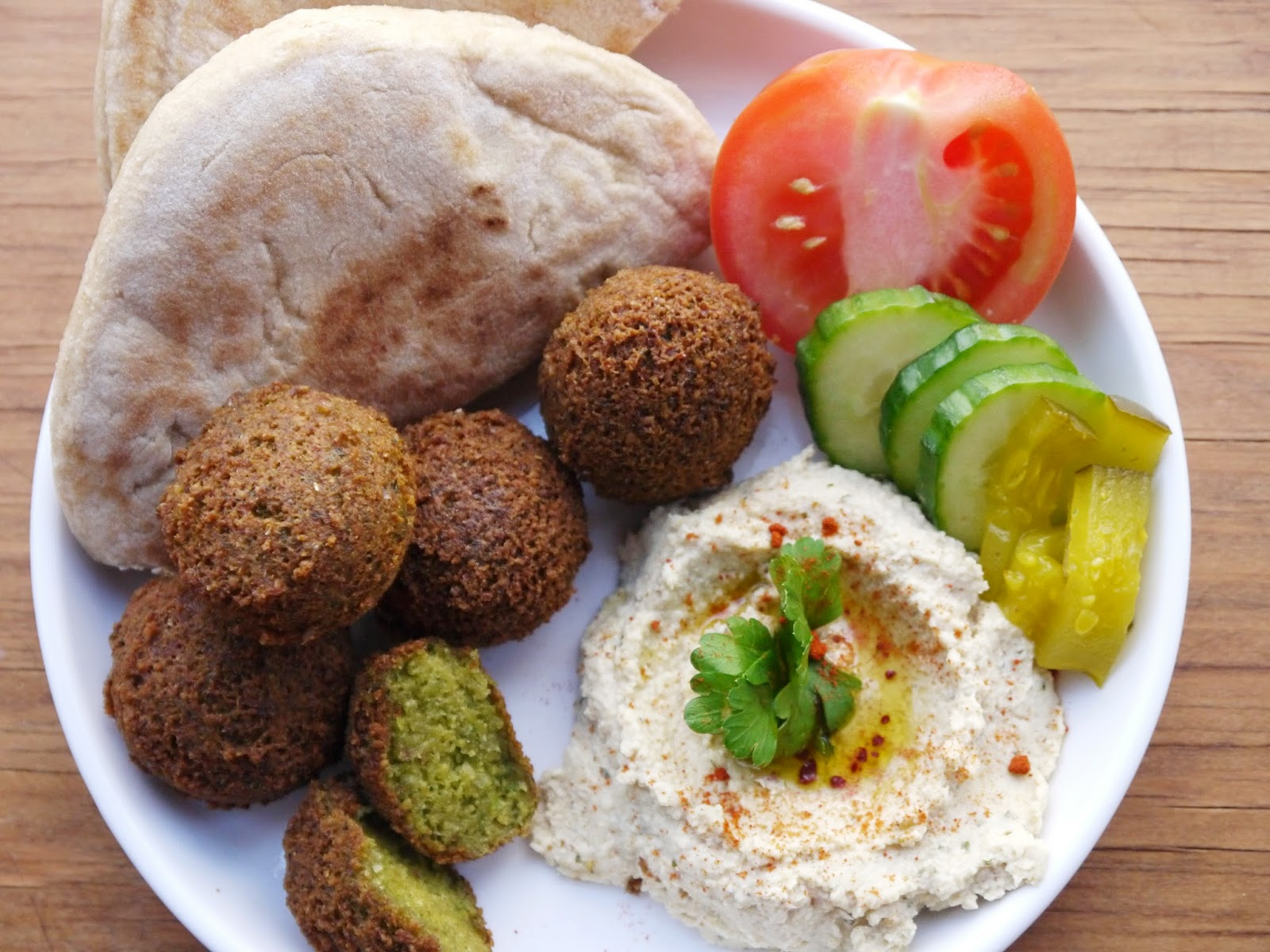
Arab breakfast with falafel, hummus, torshi and khubz bread

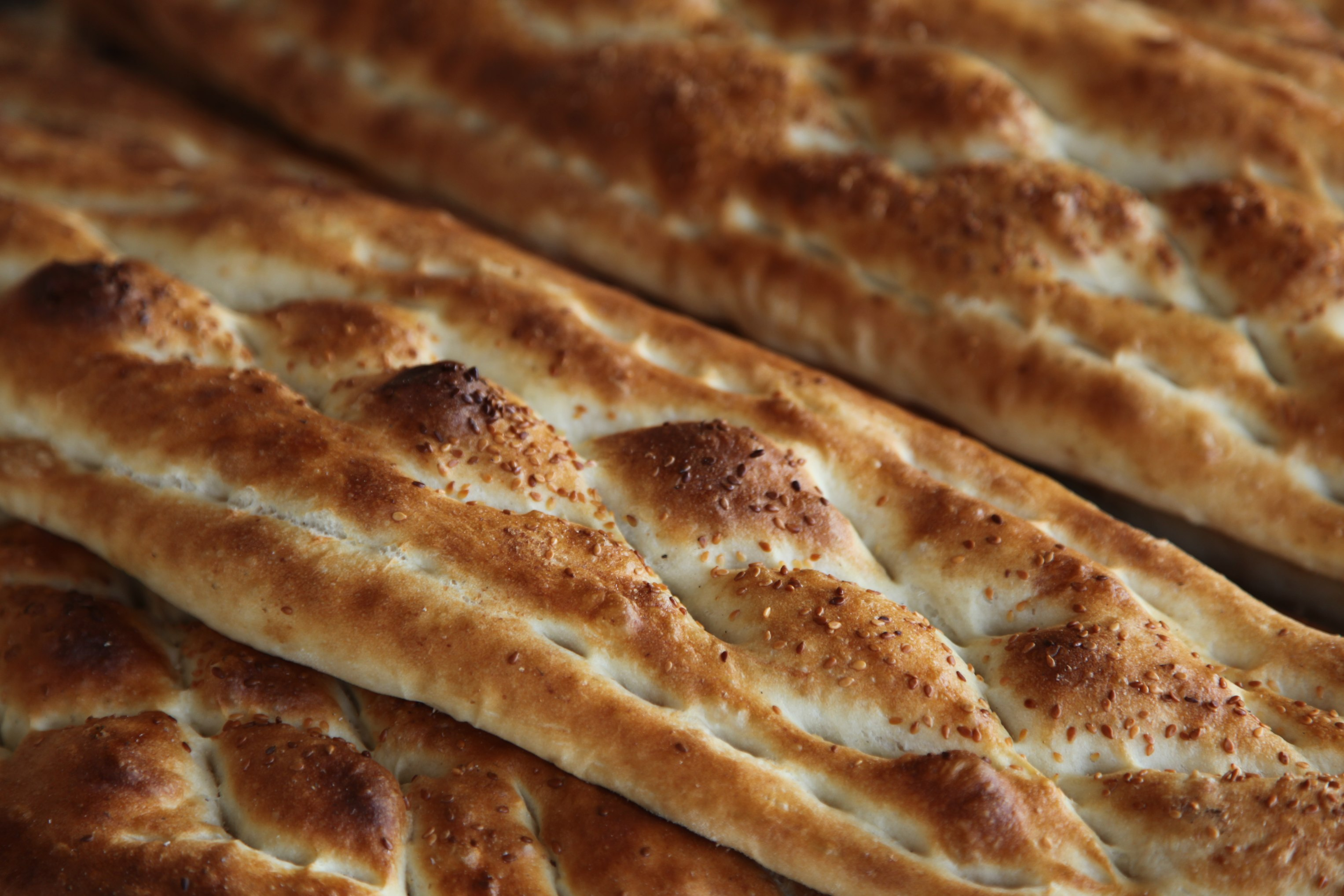
Ramadan pide

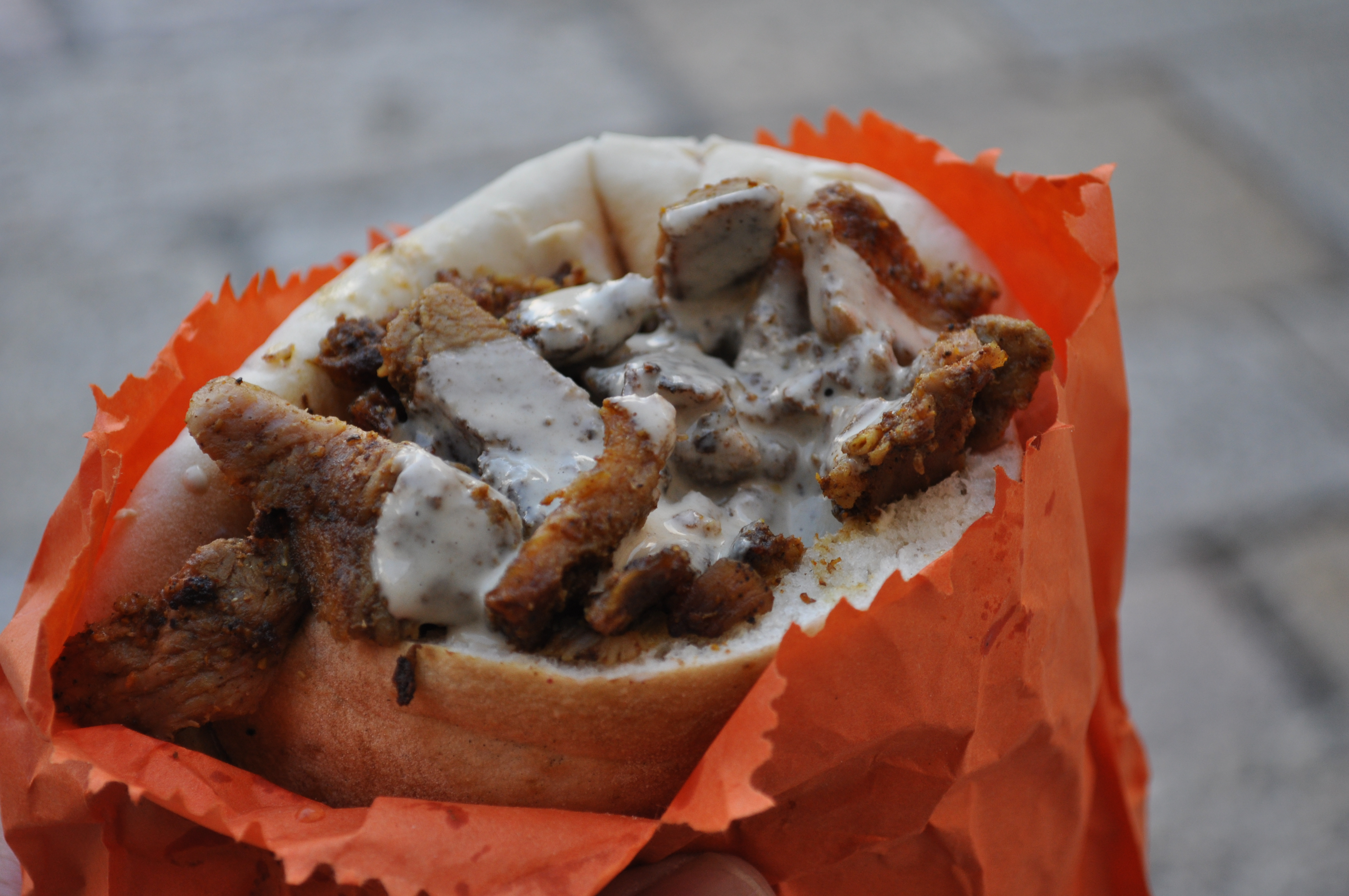
Shawarma in Jerusalem

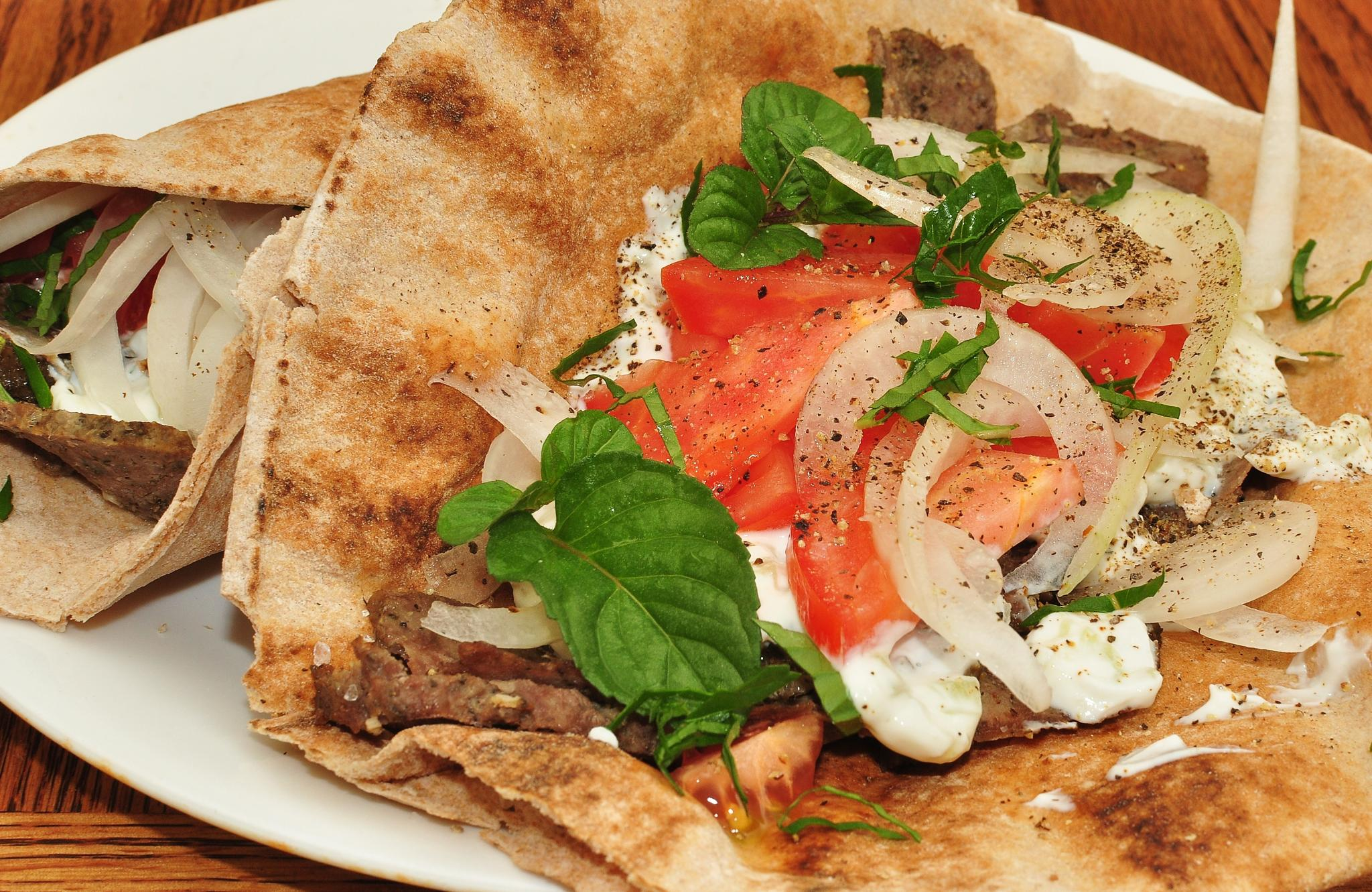
Gyro pide wrap

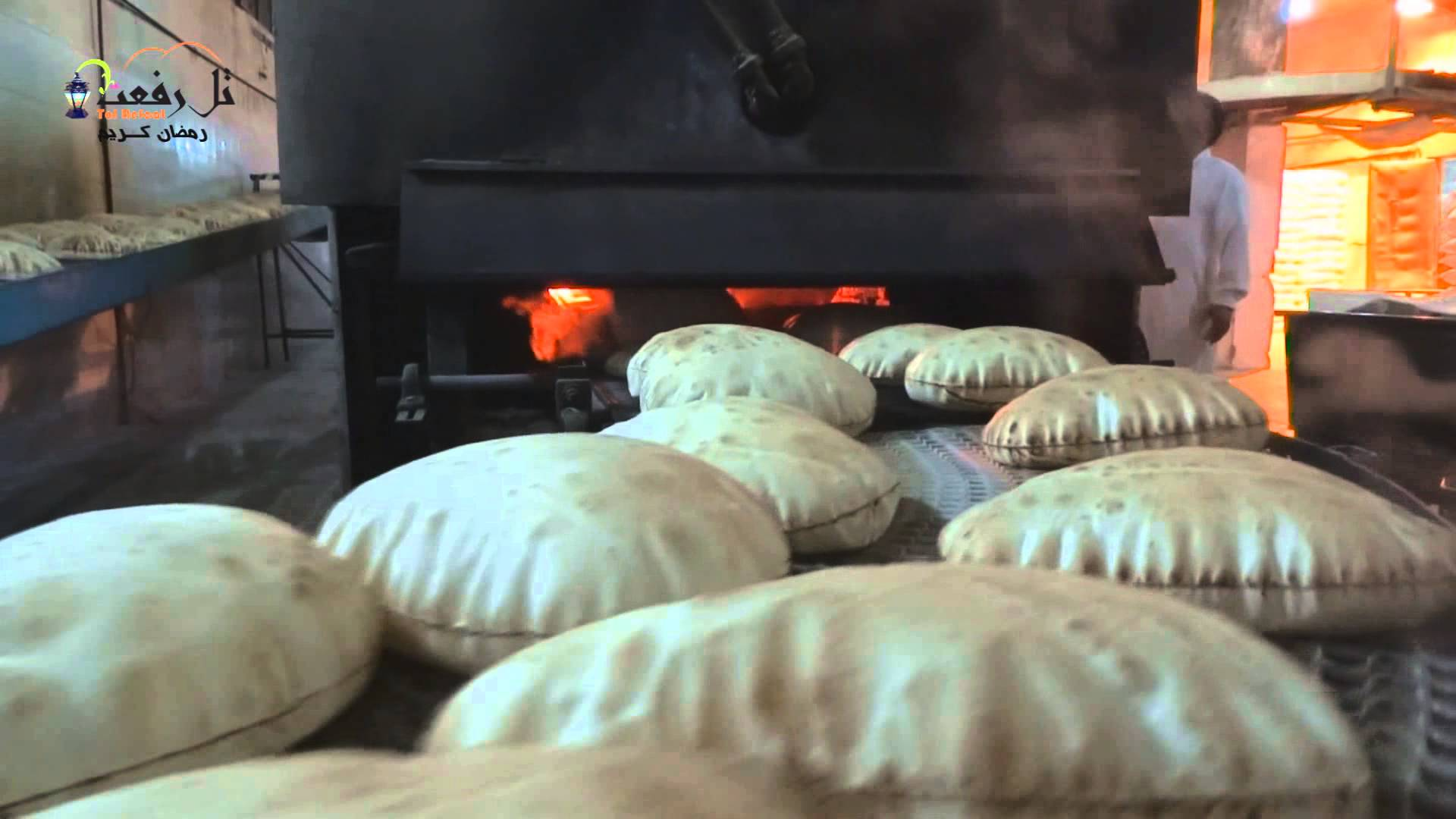
Baked khubz on conveyor in Tell Rifaat, Syria

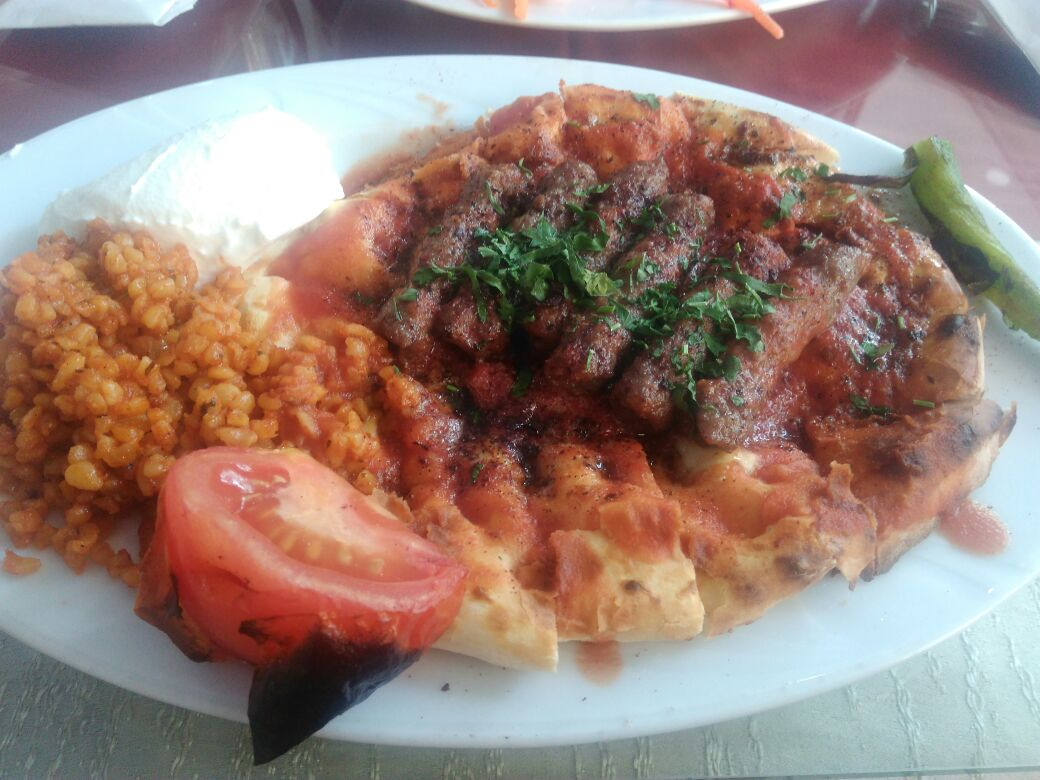
Kebab served over pide with pilav

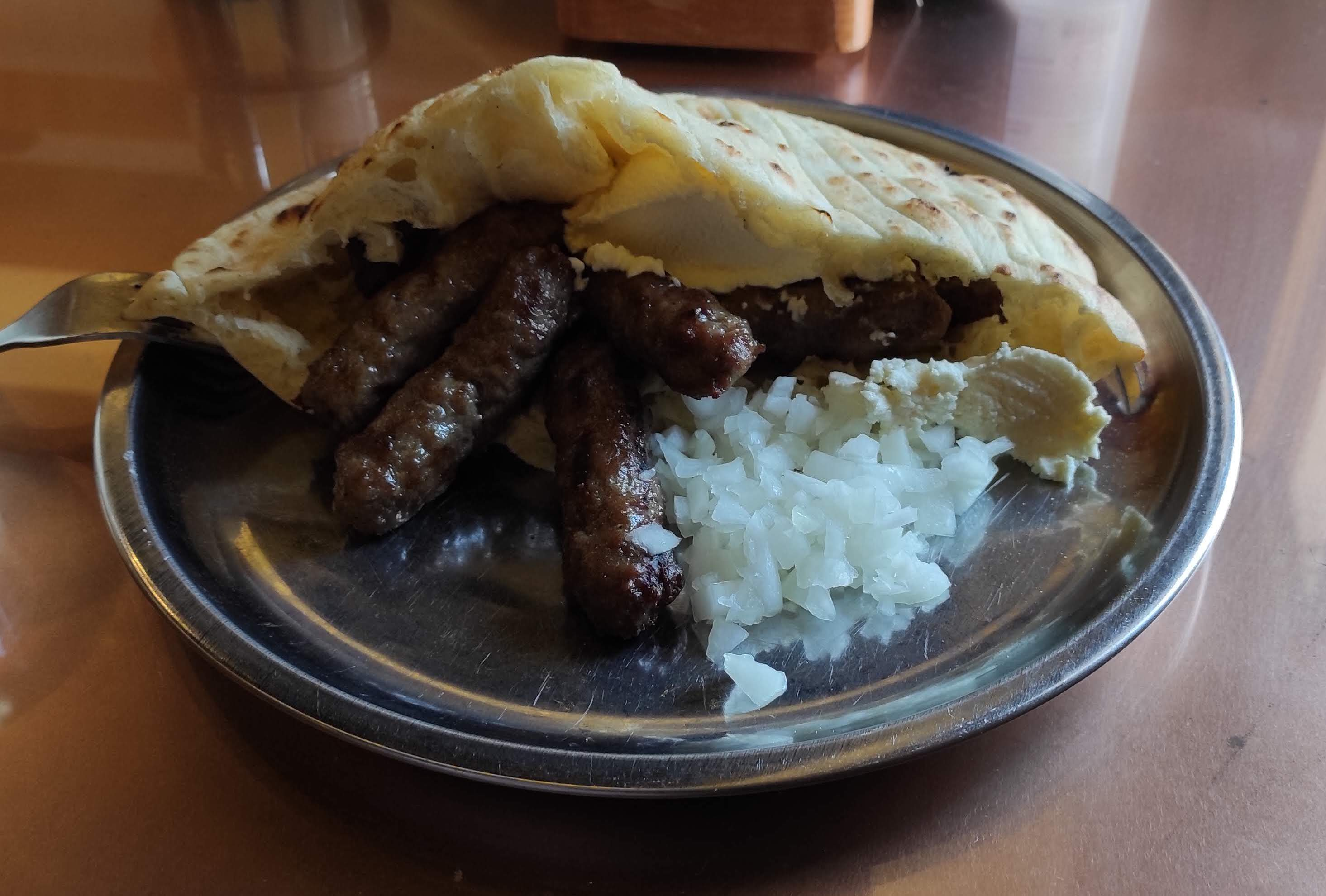
Bosnian ćevapi served with local pita variety called "somun"

== See also ==
- Chapati – an unleavened flatbread from the Indian subcontinent
- Flour tortilla – a thin unleavened flatbread from Mexico
- Focaccia – a flat oven-baked bread from Italy
- İçli pide – Turkish flatbread
- Injera – a sourdough-risen flatbread from East Africa
- Laffa – Iraqi flatbread
- Markook – an unleavened flatbread from the Middle East
- Matnakash – a leavened bread from Armenia (related to the Ramadan pita)
- Naan – a leavened, oven-baked flatbread from Central and South Asia
- Pită de Pecica – a round bread from Romania
- Rghaif – a pancake-like bread from Northwest Africa
