= Flour tortilla =

Soft, thin flatbread made from wheat flour

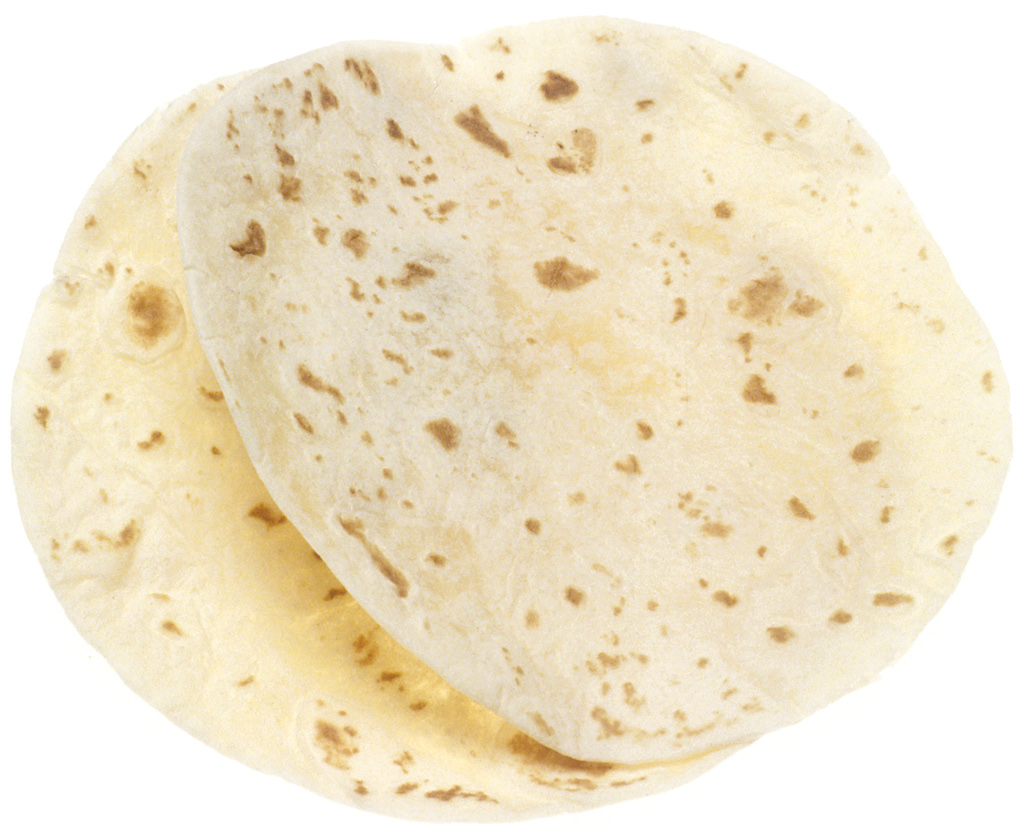
- Flour tortilla
- Type: Tortilla ( flatbread)
- Place of origin: Mexico
- Main ingredients: Wheat flour

A flour tortilla (/tɔːrˈtiːə/, /-jə/) or wheat tortilla is a tortilla made from finely ground wheat flour. Made with flour- and water-based dough, it is pressed and cooked, similar to corn tortillas. The simplest recipes use only flour, water, fat, and salt, but commercially made flour tortillas generally contain chemical leavening agents such as baking powder, and other ingredients.

== History ==
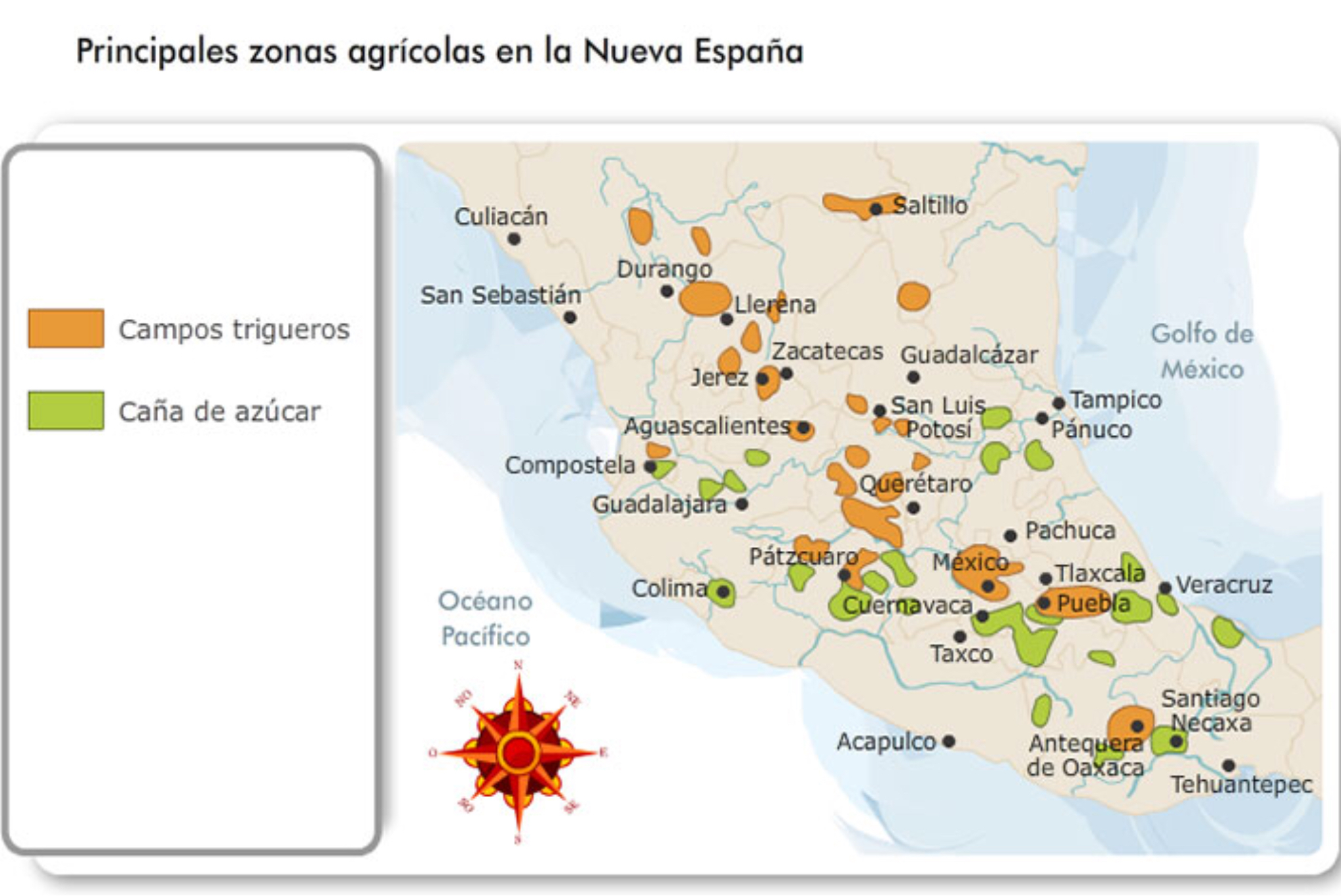
The main wheat growing regions of New Spain (Colonial Mexico) shown in orange. The vast majority in the Central region.

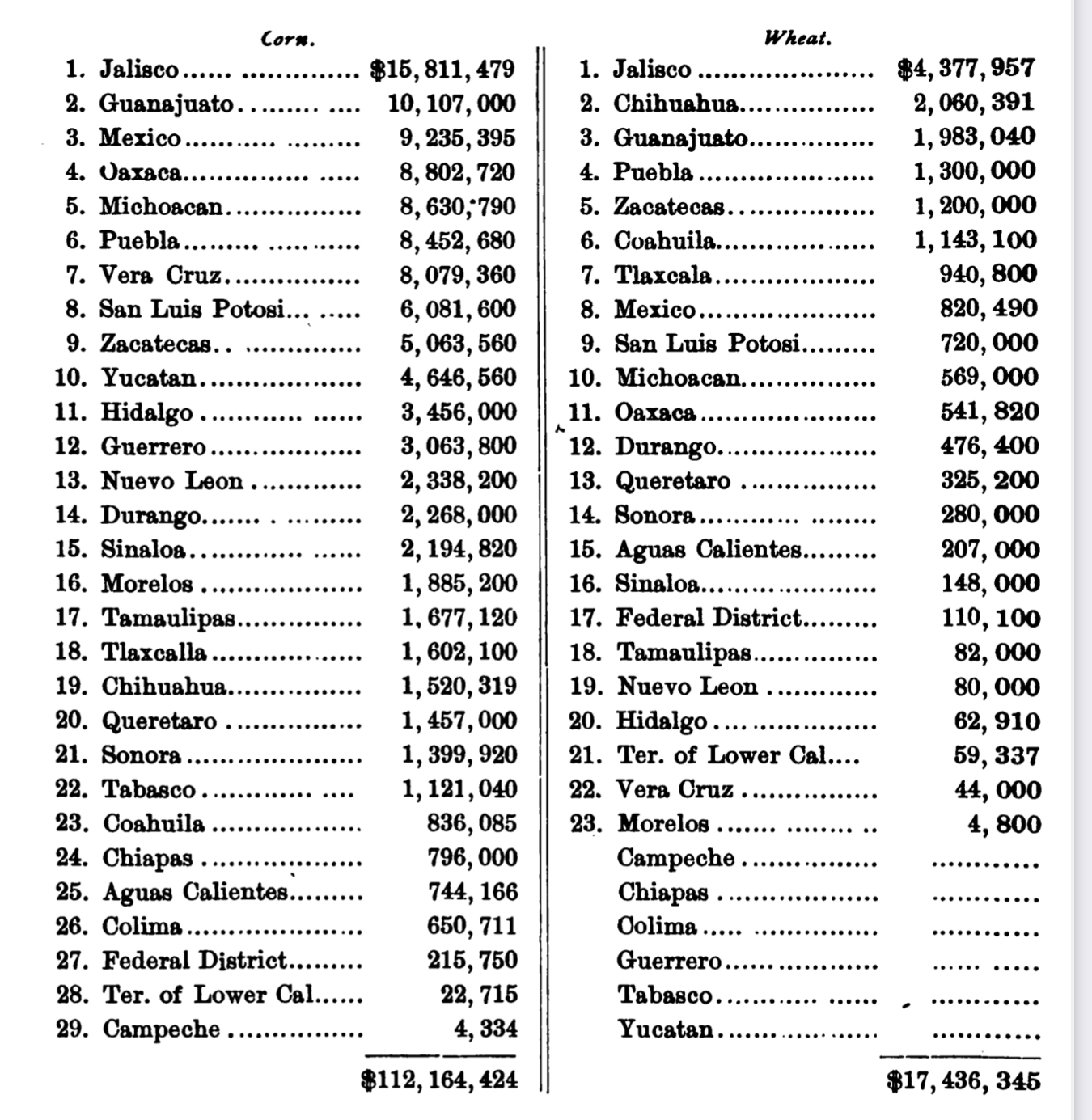
Mexican corn and wheat production by states based on dollar value in 1884. Most Mexican wheat production was in Central Mexico.

The flour tortilla was invented once the Spanish introduced wheat to Mexico in the 16th century. According to historical sources, the Spanish first introduced wheat to the lands around Mexico City in 1523. Having found great success, the cultivation of wheat soon spread beyond the Central Mexican Plateau through Catholic monks. It reached the region of Michoacán in the 1530s with the Franciscans, while the Dominicans brought it to Oaxaca in the 1540s and gave grain to the inhabitants of that region to produce flour and prepare unleavened bread, which was traditionally prepared for religious ceremonies in the Catholic Church.

The wheat growing region of Mexico was in the temperate and cold regions between 4000 and 6000 ft to 9000 ft above sea level. The majority of wheat was produced in Central Mexico, with the main wheat growing regions being the Lerma Valley (Toluca Valley), the Atlixco and San Martin Valleys in Puebla, the Bajío region and the Valley of Oaxaca; these areas produced the most valued and esteemed wheat in the country. Within these regions, the largest producing states were Jalisco, Guanajuato and Puebla. The top six wheat producing states in the 1890’s, based on the median yield measured in hectoliters, were Jalisco, Zacatecas, Guanajuato, Chihuahua, Puebla, and the State of Mexico; with the exception of Chihuahua, all are in Central Mexico.

An 1884 report on the commerce between the United States and Mexico states:

Wheat grows on the plateau of Mexico at from 6,000 to 9,000 feet above sea level, and between the 18th and 24th parallels of latitude. […] The wheat growing area of Mexico, par excellence, extends from, say, Puebla nearly to Colima, about 500 miles east and west, and from Southern Michoacán to Zacatecas, about 400 miles north and south. This plateau is broken by mountain ranges into a number of rich districts specially adapted for the growing of wheat, namely, the Lerma Valley, roughly, 200 by 16 miles; the Bajio (Northern Michoacán, Jalisco and Southern Guanajuato), 200 by 200miles; Aguascalientes, 50 by 50 miles; the San Luis Potosi and Queretaro district, 150 by 30 miles.

Considering that most wheat production was in Central and Southern Mexico, not in the North, it is probable that wheat flour tortillas may have originated in this region. Flour tortillas could be found in places like San Luis Potosí, another of the wheat regions of Mexico, but which is no longer considered an area where flour tortillas are considered a “staple”. A recipe for flour tortillas appears in the Mexican cookbook Diccionario de Cocina o el Nuevo Cocinero Mexicano en forma de Diccionario (1845), a cookbook with recipes mainly from central and southern Mexico.

Based on historical records, corn tortillas were the main staple "bread" in Northern Mexico and what is now the South Western United States in the 19th century, just as in Central and Southern Mexico. There are few mentions of flour tortillas and they're usually an exception. Corn tortillas were the staple bread in New Mexico, Arizona, California, and Texas.

Central Mexico started to lose its status as the country’s largest wheat producing region to Northern Mexico, until the 1930’s, after the Mexican Revolution, when Coahuila became the largest wheat producer in 1931, replacing Guanajuato, which had been the largest producer until that point.

The name itself comes from Latin. Tortilla is the diminutive of torta, a shortened form of torta panis (twisted bread), which has cognates in different romance languages such as tourte in French or torta in Italian. These words have different meanings but all of them refer to a cake-shaped bread or preparation.

=== Folk history ===
One of the most common folk origin stories is that flour tortillas were invented in Northern Mexico, based on the erroneous belief that wheat could only be grown in the north while corn could only grow in the south. Some argue that hot and arid climates, like that of Sonora, are less supportive for growing corn, thus, it grew poorly while it was more suitable for wheat. Because of this, some argue that the Spaniards did not know how to make corn tortillas in the North, so they decided to make them from flour.

But the evidence proves the opposite, as most wheat was grown in Central Mexico until the mid 20th century. While corn was plentiful in Northern Mexico and the American Southwest, and constituted the main dietary staple of the inhabitants of the region, and was, in no way, hampered by the harsh, hot and dry climate.

German Jesuit priest, Ignaz Pfefferkorn, who lived in Sonora from 1756 until 1767, wrote that Sonorans depended on corn for most of their diet and ate it in many forms, stating that besides tortillas:

The Spaniards also make different kinds of pastries from maize flour. The most important are puchas, biscochuelos, and tamales.[…] In the field and on journeys, where there is no convenience for cooking, the Sonorans eat maize. They take along the amount needed in the form of pinole. This is prepared by the women. After the maize has been somewhat softened in water and then dried out they roast it in an earthen dish and stir it constantly so that it does not burn. In roasting, the kernels burst open, and the pith breaks forth just like snow-white flowers. Maize roasted in this manner is called esquita and is not unpleasant to eat. The esquita is then ground on the metate to make pinole.[…] The Sonorans eat maize with the greatest pleasure and with special appetite when it is fresh from the field, ripe but still tender. They break off the so-called elotes (the thick ears with kernels attached to them) and cook and serve them with the olla (boiled mutton). In this form the elotes appear on the best tables, for the Mexican-born Spaniards everywhere like this dish just as much as do the Indians. For this reason elotes are sold in the city markets just as vegetables in Europe. Some roast them in hot embers as is done with tamales. This indisputably improves their flavor, which is somewhat similar to that of roast chestnuts.

Others attribute the origin of flour tortillas to the Jews, specifically the Crypto-Jews and Conversos, the exiled Spanish Jews that lived in Mexico. According to this hypothesis, these Jews invented or introduced the flour tortilla as a substitution for Matzah or unleavened bread, supposedly because they considered corn as non-kosher since it was fed to pigs. But the Mexican Jews were mostly Sephardic, and had a completely different diet and never followed such restrictions, thus, corn was considered kosher. In fact, evidence from the 17th century Mexican Inquisition, in the Archivo General de la Nación, shows that Jews in northern Mexico were consuming corn tortillas because they had no access to wheaten unleavened bread and, in many cases, their consumption was used as evidence against them, as was the case of Salomón de Machorro, a Sephardic Jewish man who was denounced and tried in 1650 for having consumed corn tortillas with fish and vegetables during Passover.

Some writers argue that the reason flour tortillas are rarely mentioned in 19th century texts, specially those from Texas, is because of racism, segregation and the "ethnic cleansing" of the Tejano people after the Texas Revolution of 1836. But, there’s no evidence to support this and, on the contrary, there’s evidence that show that corn tortillas were the only tortilla mentioned in texts even before the secession of Texas from Mexico. In fact, some evidence shows that wheat was extremely scarce in Texas before it seceded from Mexico in 1836, Pierre-Marie-François de Pàges, for example, couldn’t find wheat bread in Texas until he reached Saltillo in the 1760’s.

== Etymology ==
Tortilla, from Spanish torta, cake, plus the diminutive -illa, literally means "little cake".

Tortilla in Iberian Spanish also means omelette. As such, this wheat flour flatbread tortilla is not to be confused with the Spanish omelette or any other egg based one.

== Production ==
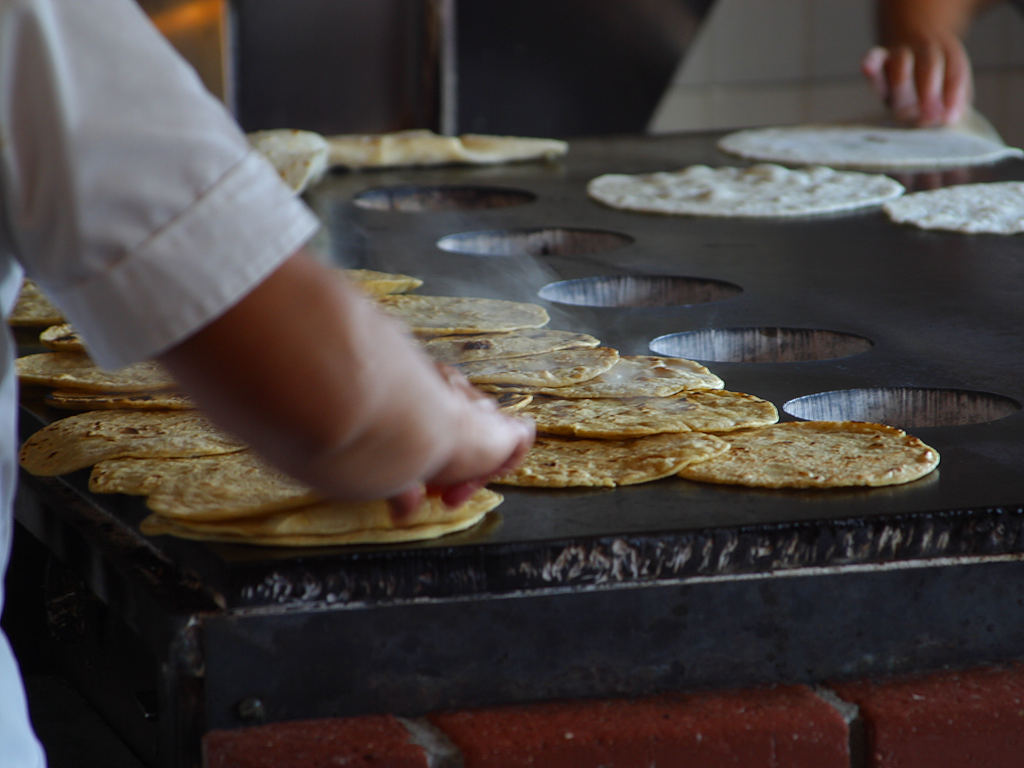
Tortillas being made in Old Town San Diego

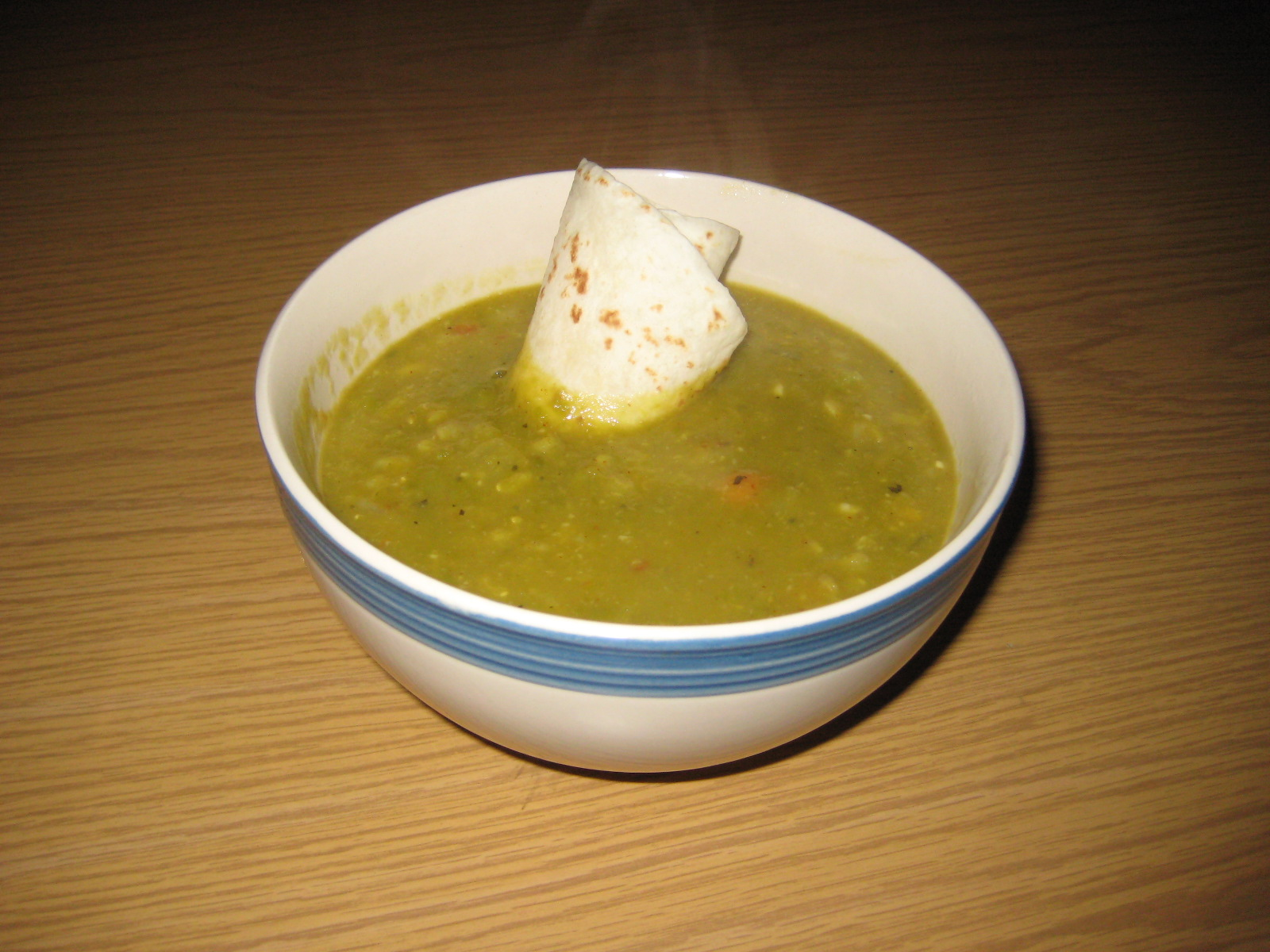
A thick, American-style pea soup garnished with a tortilla sliver

Wheat tortillas are a staple of the northern Mexican states (such as Sonora, Sinaloa and Chihuahua) and throughout the Southwestern United States.

Tortillas vary in size from about 6 to over 30 cm (2.4 to over 12 in), depending on the region of the country and the dish for which it is intended.

Industrially produced tortillas typically contain numerous chemicals in order to ease the production process, control texture and flavor, and to extend shelf life. Work has been done at Washington State University to develop methods for producing tortillas on a mass scale while still using only whole-wheat flour, water, oil, and salt, with a fermented flour-and-water sourdough starter replacing chemical leaveners.

== Tortillas today ==
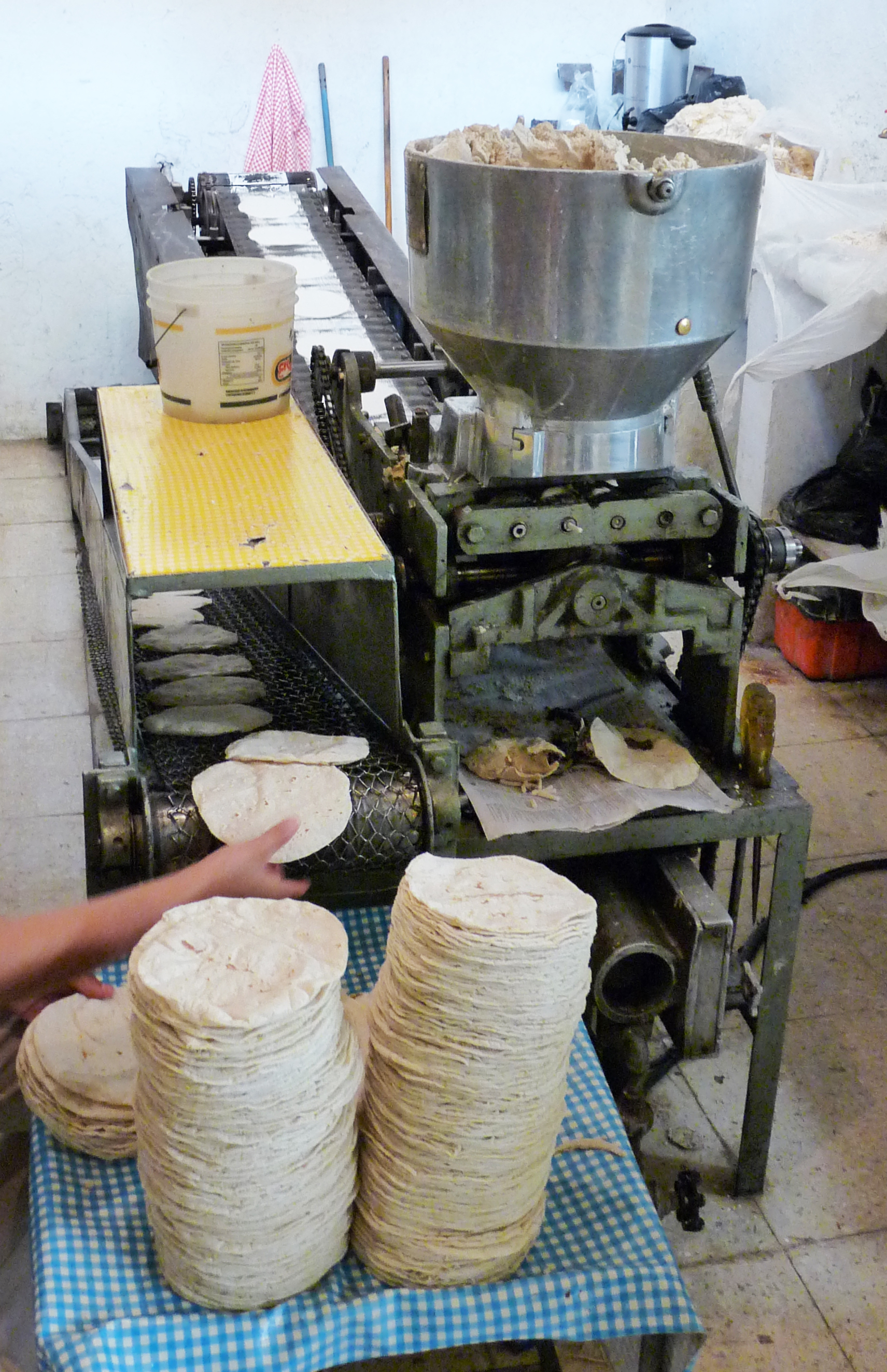
Nixtamalised corn tortilla machine (Xochimilco market)

Today, personal and industrial (Mexican-style) tortilla-making equipment has facilitated and expedited tortilla making. Manually operated wooden tortilla presses of the past led to today's industrial tortilla machinery, which can produce up to 60,000 tortillas per hour. Tortillas are now not only made from maize meal, but also from wheat flour; home-made and store-bought tortillas are made in many flavors and varieties.

Tortillas remain a staple food in Mexico and Central America, and have gained popularity and market share elsewhere. In the U.S., tortillas have grown from an "ethnic" to a mainstream food. They have surpassed bagels and muffins, and have now become the number two packaged bread product sold in the U.S (behind sliced bread). The Tortilla Industry Association (TIA) estimates that in the U.S. alone, the tortilla industry (tortillas and their products – tortilla chips, tostada shells and taco shells) has become a US$6 billion a year industry.

== Nutritional information ==
Soft wheat tortillas use wheat instead of masa as the primary ingredient. The Mission Foods brand lists the following ingredients: enriched bleached wheat flour (wheat flour, niacin, reduced iron, thiamine mononitrate, riboflavin, folic acid), water, vegetable shortening (interesterified soybean oil, hydrogenated soybean oil and/or palm oil), contains 2% or less of: salt, sugar, leavening (sodium bicarbonate, sodium aluminum sulfate, corn starch, monocalcium phosphate and/or sodium acid pyrophosphate, calcium sulfate), distilled monoglycerides, enzymes, wheat starch, calcium carbonate, antioxidants (tocopherols, ascorbic acid, citric acid), cellulose gum, guar gum, dough conditioner (fumaric acid, sodium metabisulfite and/or mono- and diglycerides), calcium propionate and sorbic acid (to preserve freshness).

The recipe recommended by American chef and restaurateur Rick Bayless who specializes in traditional Mexican cuisine uses just four ingredients: flour, lard, salt, and water.

The nutritional information for the Mission brand 49 g wheat tortilla is:

- total fat: 3.5 g (saturated 3.5 g, monounsaturated 1 g) – 5% daily allowance
- sodium: 420 mg – 18% daily allowance
- total carbohydrate: 24 g – 8% daily allowance
- dietary fiber: 1 g – 4% daily allowance
- protein: 4 g
- calcium: 8% daily allowance
- iron: 8% daily allowance

== Consumption ==
Wheat flour tortillas have been used on many American spaceflights since 1985 as an easy solution to the problems of handling food in microgravity and preventing bread crumbs from escaping into delicate instruments.

=== Mexico ===
In Mexico "tortilla" most often refers to the ubiquitous corn tortilla. However, many Mexican dishes are primarily made with flour tortillas such as burritos, quesadillas, chimichangas, and fajitas. Flour tortillas are also served as a side dish with larger meals.

Flour tortillas are commonly filled with meat, chopped potatoes, refried beans, cheese, hot sauce and other ingredients to make dishes such as tacos, quesadillas and burritos (a dish originating in the Ciudad Juarez, Chihuahua, Mexico/El Paso, Texas area).

=== United States, U.S. territories and Northern Mexico ===
In Northern Mexico and much of the United States, "tortillas" mean wheat-flour tortillas. They are the foundation of Mexican border cooking. Their popularity was driven by the low cost of inferior grades of wheat flour provided to border markets and by their ability to keep and ship well.

In Guam, it is called titiyas and it is paired with kelaguen mannok.

Tortilla art is the use of tortillas as a substrate for painting. Tortillas are baked and then covered in acrylic before they are painted.

=== Central America ===
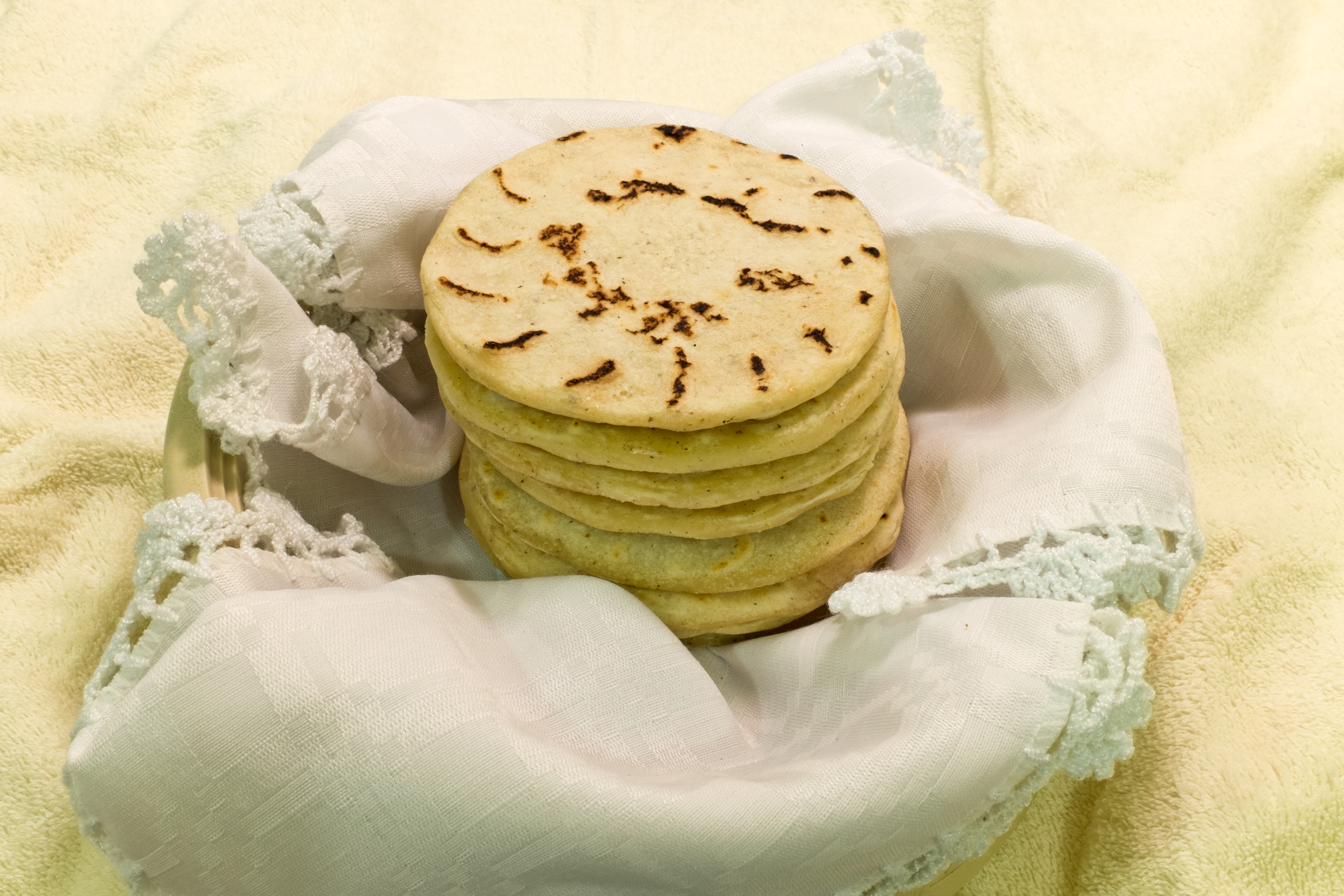
Handmade Guatemalan and Salvadorean tortillas are thicker than Mexican ones. These are about 5 mm thick and about 10 cm in diameter, just like Mexican gorditas. Although they superficially resemble pupusas, they are quite different (burn marks, for instance, are different)

Tortillas in Central America sometimes differ somewhat from their Mexican counterparts, although are made similarly. In Guatemala and El Salvador, the tortillas are about 5 millimeters thick and about 10 centimeters in diameter, thicker than Mexican tortillas, but similar in size to Mexican gorditas. Like the Mexican tortillas, the maize is soaked in a mixture of water and lime (or lye), then rinsed and ground. In El Salvador, they sometimes use sorghum (called maicillo there) to make tortillas when there is not enough maize. Also in El Salvador, there is a particularly large and thick tortilla called a "chenga" on top of which food is placed, like an edible plate, to serve food to the labourers in coffee plantations and farms.

Honduras is well known for using wheat flour tortillas to make baleadas, which consist of a wheat flour tortilla, folded in half, with various items (beans, cream, scrambled eggs) put inside.

Maize and wheat tortillas can often be found in supermarkets in El Salvador and Costa Rica, produced by Mexican companies.

Stuffed tortillas known as pupusas are also a famous dish of traditional Salvadoran cuisine.

=== United States ===
Tortillas are widely used in the United States, in recipes of Mexican origin and many others. As a testament to their popularity, the Tortilla Industry Association (TIA) estimated Americans consumed approximately 85 billion tortillas in 2000 (not including tortilla chips). They are more popular than all other ethnic breads such as English muffins, pita bread, and bagels.

Many people from both Northern Mexico and throughout the Southwestern United States eat tortillas as a staple food. Many restaurants use wheat flour tortillas in a variety of non-Mexican and Mexican recipes. Many grocery stores sell ready-made tortillas.

== See also ==
- Arepa, a ground maize dough from Colombia and Venezuela
- Focaccia, a flat oven-baked bread from Italy
- Chapati, an unleavened flatbread from the Indian subcontinent
- Injera, a sourdough-risen flatbread from East Africa
- Khachapuri, a breaded cheese dish from Georgia
- Matnakash, a leavened bread from Armenia
- Piadina, a thin flatbread from Northern Italy
- Pită de Pecica, a round bread from Romania
- Rghaif, a pancake-like bread from Northwest Africa
