= Pan brioche =

Italian style of bread

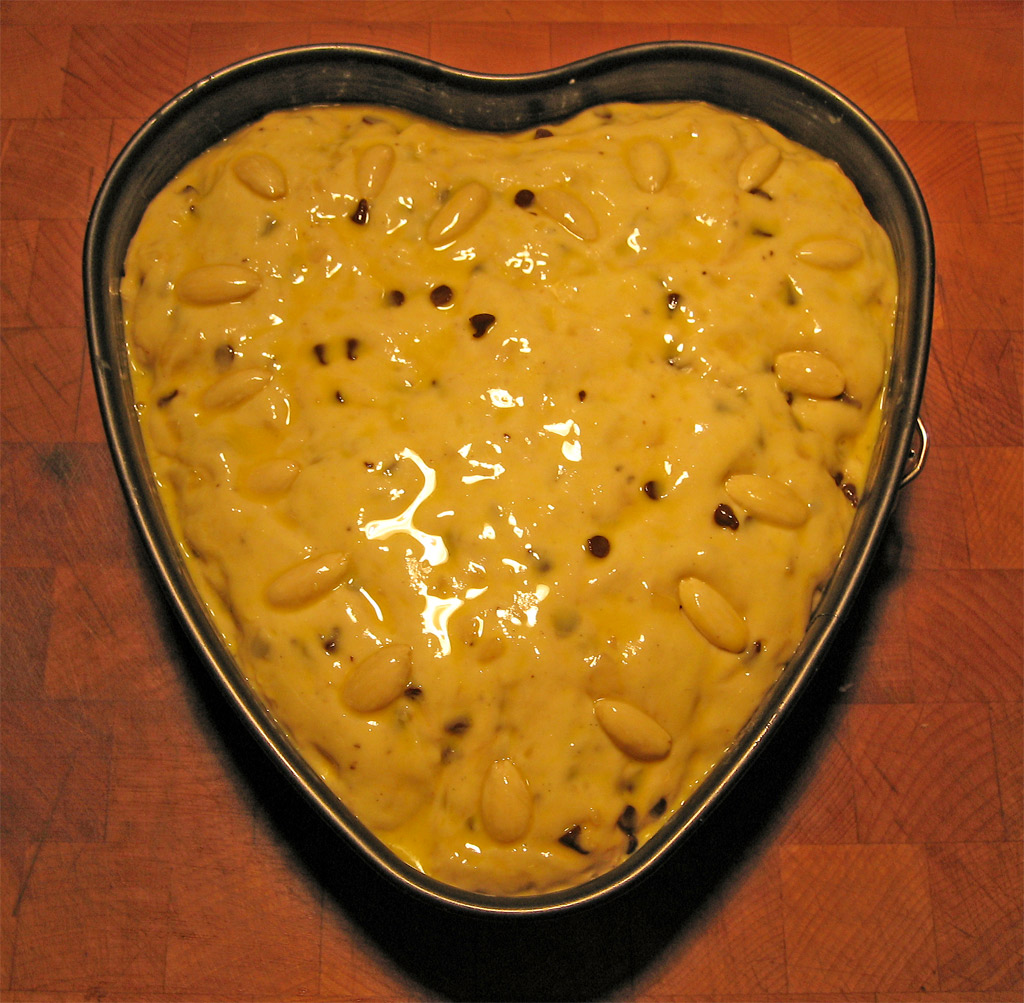
- pan brioche dolce
- Type: Bread
- Region or state: Italy

In Italian cuisine, a pan brioche is a kind of bread similar to a brioche. There are many variations of pan brioche, such as pan brioche dolce, pan brioche speziato, pan brioche salato, and pan brioche farcito.
