= Ramazan pidesi =

Turkish traditional bread

Ramadan pita
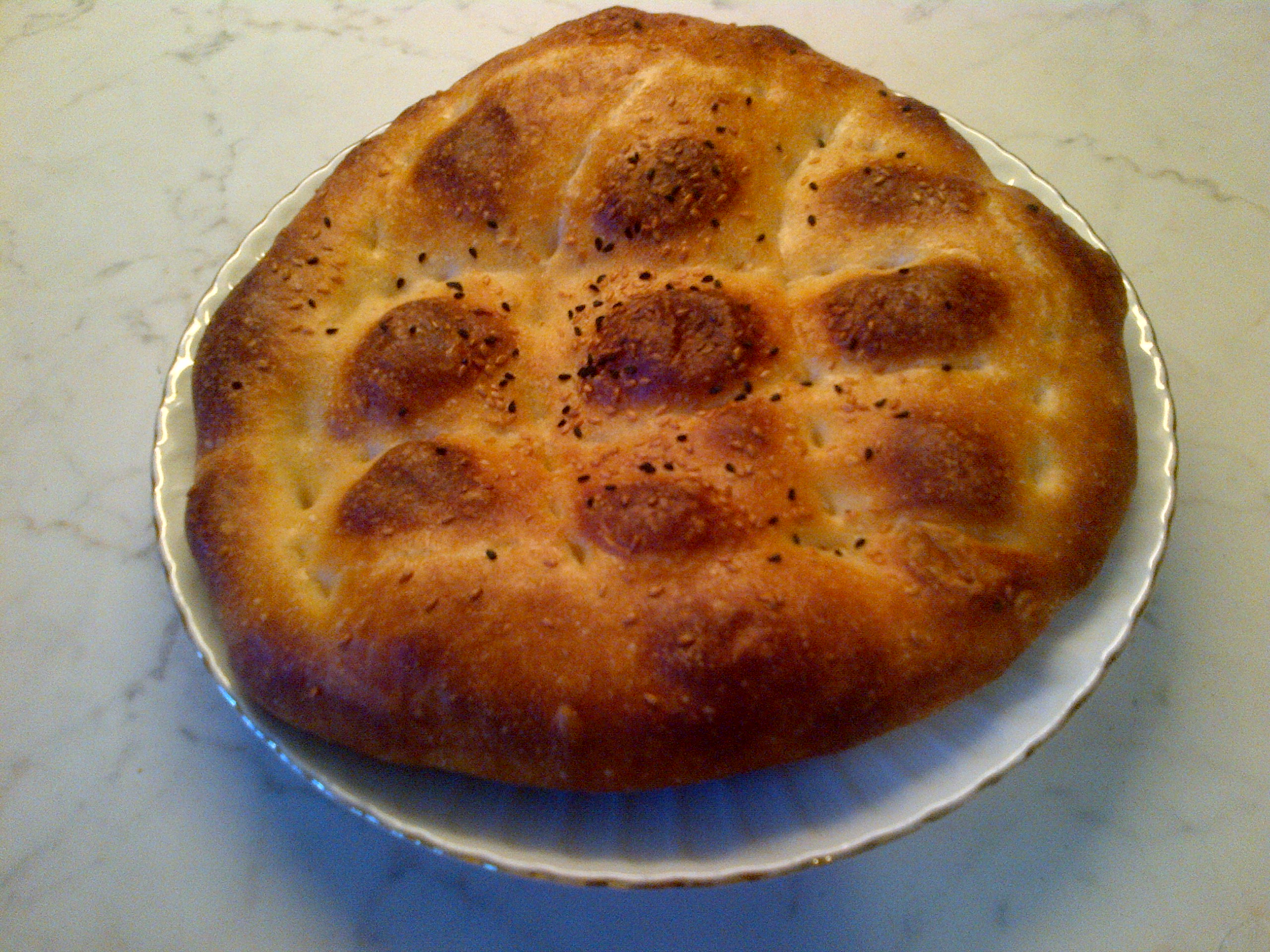
- Type: Bread
- Place of origin: Turkey
- Main ingredients: Wheat flour, yeast

Ramazan pidesi (Turkish for Ramadan pita) is a traditional soft-leavened Turkish bread.

Round and rather flat in form, and having a weave-like patterned crust, Ramazan pidesi is made of wheat flour with yeast, and topped with sesame and Nigella sativa seeds. Egg wash is a common addition, added both for its taste and its appearance.

It is traditionally served for the iftar and sahur meals during the holy month of Ramadan.

== History ==
The bread is said to date back to the Ottoman Empire, 17th century Ottoman traveler Evliya Çelebi described similar breads with toppings like anise seeds and saffron in one of his writings.

== See also ==
- Matnakash from Armenia
- Naan
- Pita
- Barbari bread from Iran
- Tonis puri
- Lagana
