= Matnakash =

Armenian bread

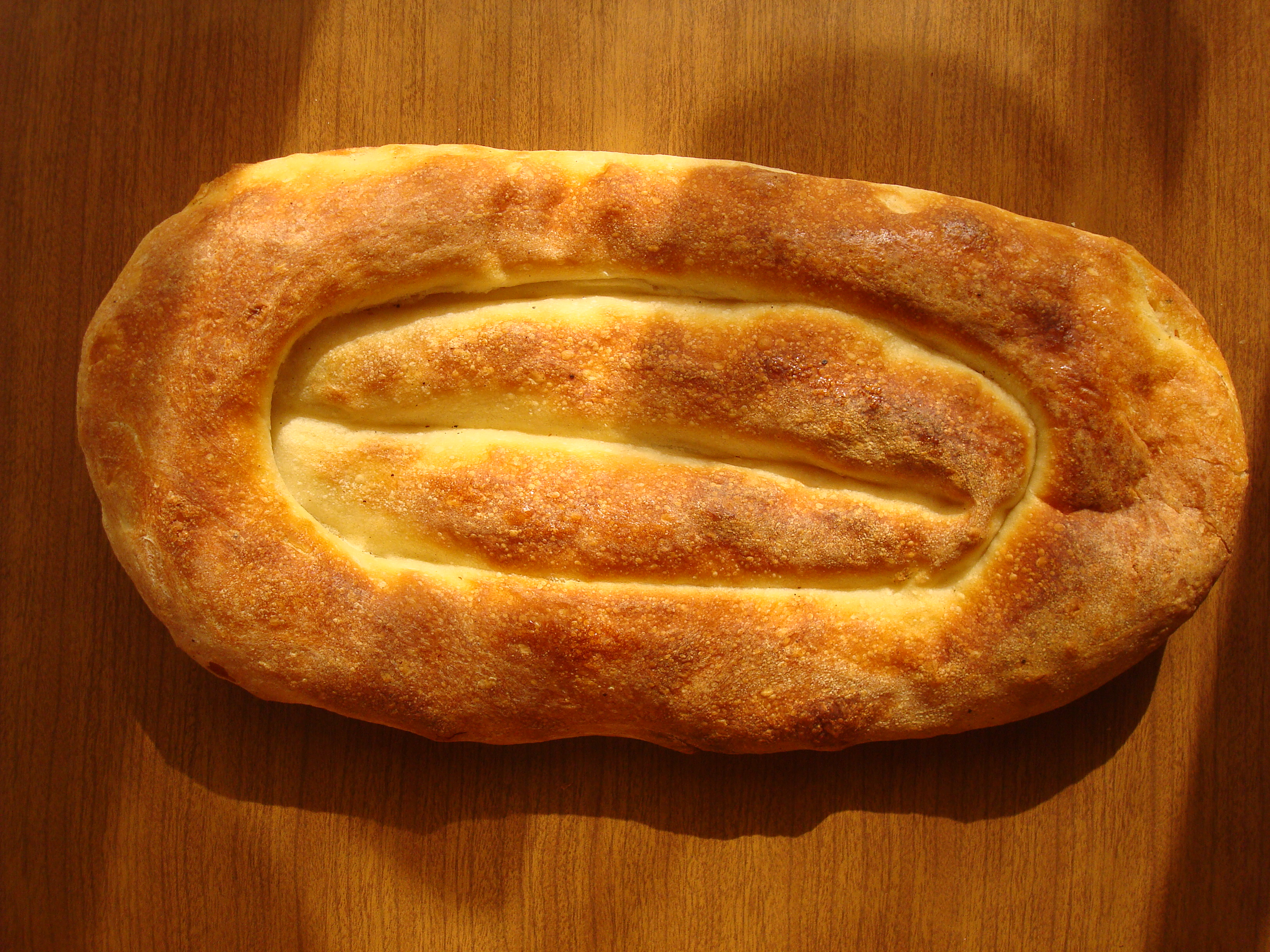
- Type: Bread
- Place of origin: Armenia
- Associated cuisine: Armenian cuisine
- Main ingredients: Wheat flour; yeast or sourdough starter

Matnakash (Armenian: մատնաքաշ) is a leavened traditional Armenian bread. The word matnakash means "finger draw" or "finger pull", referring to the way the bread is prepared. It is made of wheat flour with yeast or sourdough starter. It is shaped into oval or round loaves with longitudinal or criss-crossed scoring. The characteristic golden or golden-brown color of its crust is achieved by coating the surface of the loaves with sweetened tea essence before baking.

Matnakash is also popular in places with large Armenian populations as a result of the Armenian diaspora.

== History ==
Matnakash was honored in Soviet times. In the 1930s, food specialists in Soviet Armenia wanted to mark the new communist country with a more modern-looking bread. The matnakash became mass-produced urban bread. Even the bakers' patterns on the bread were re-interpreted to fit the Soviet agenda. It resembled a plowed field with rows and furrows. The bread's rim was interpreted as an agricultural field and its imprinted lines as tilled rows.

== Gallery ==
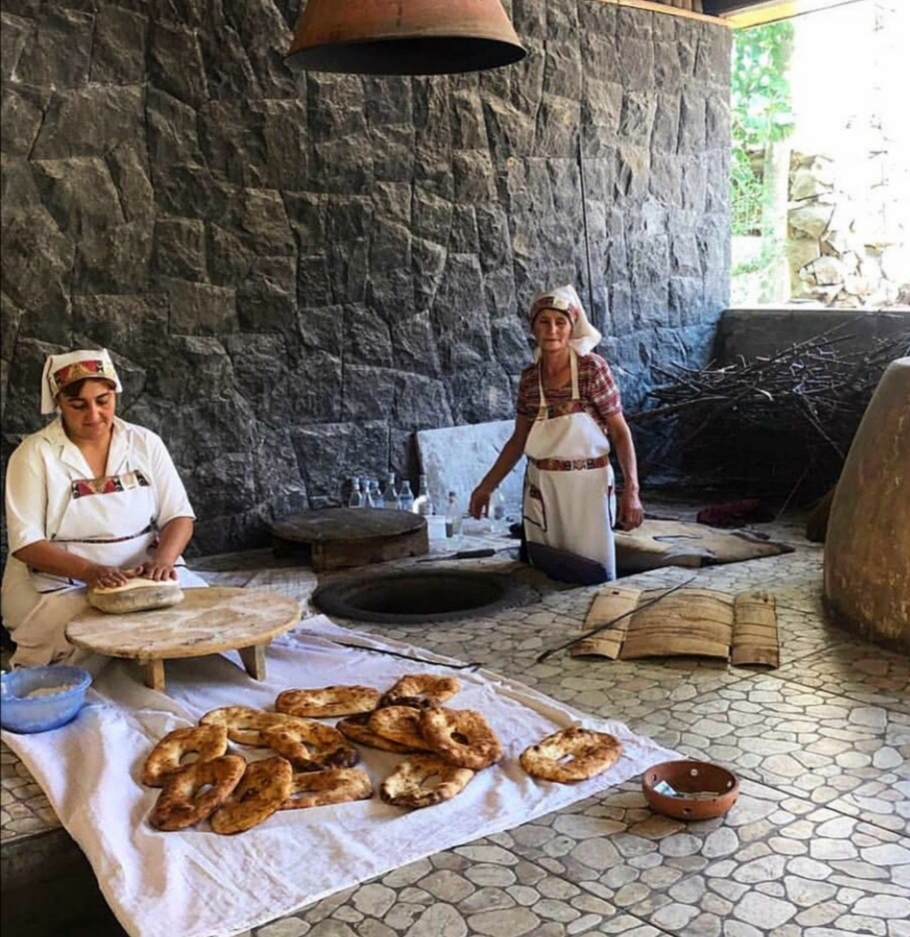

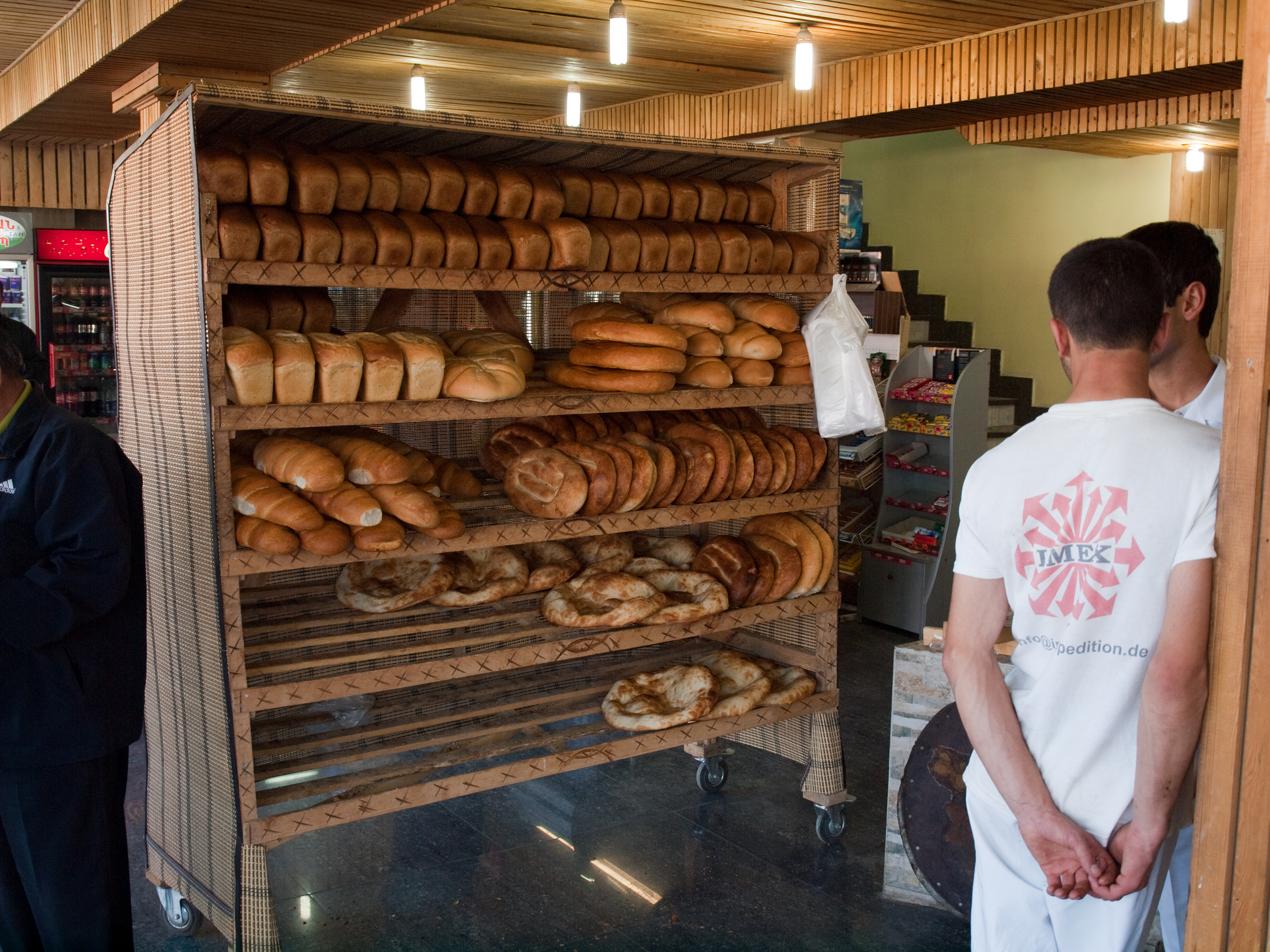

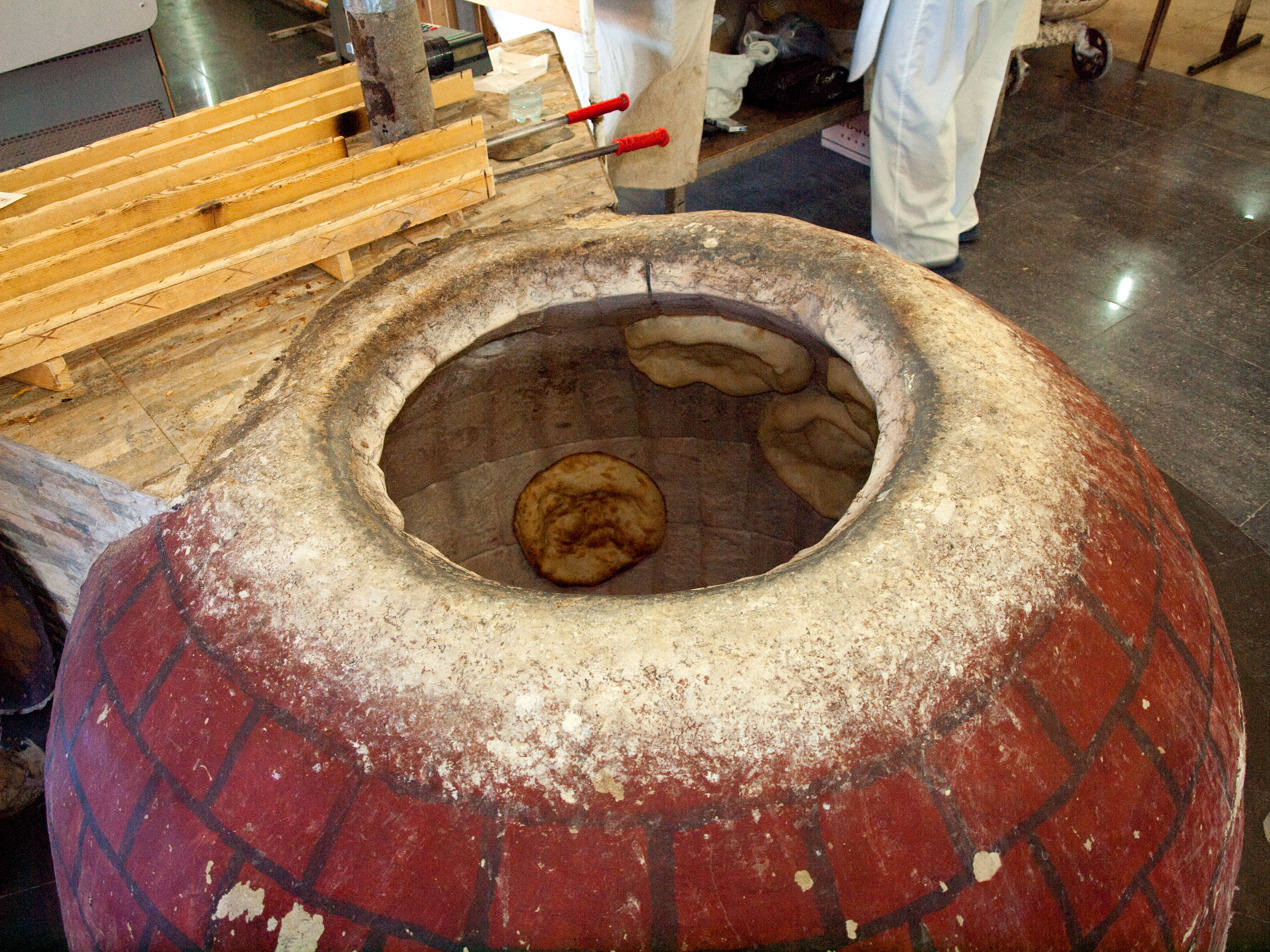

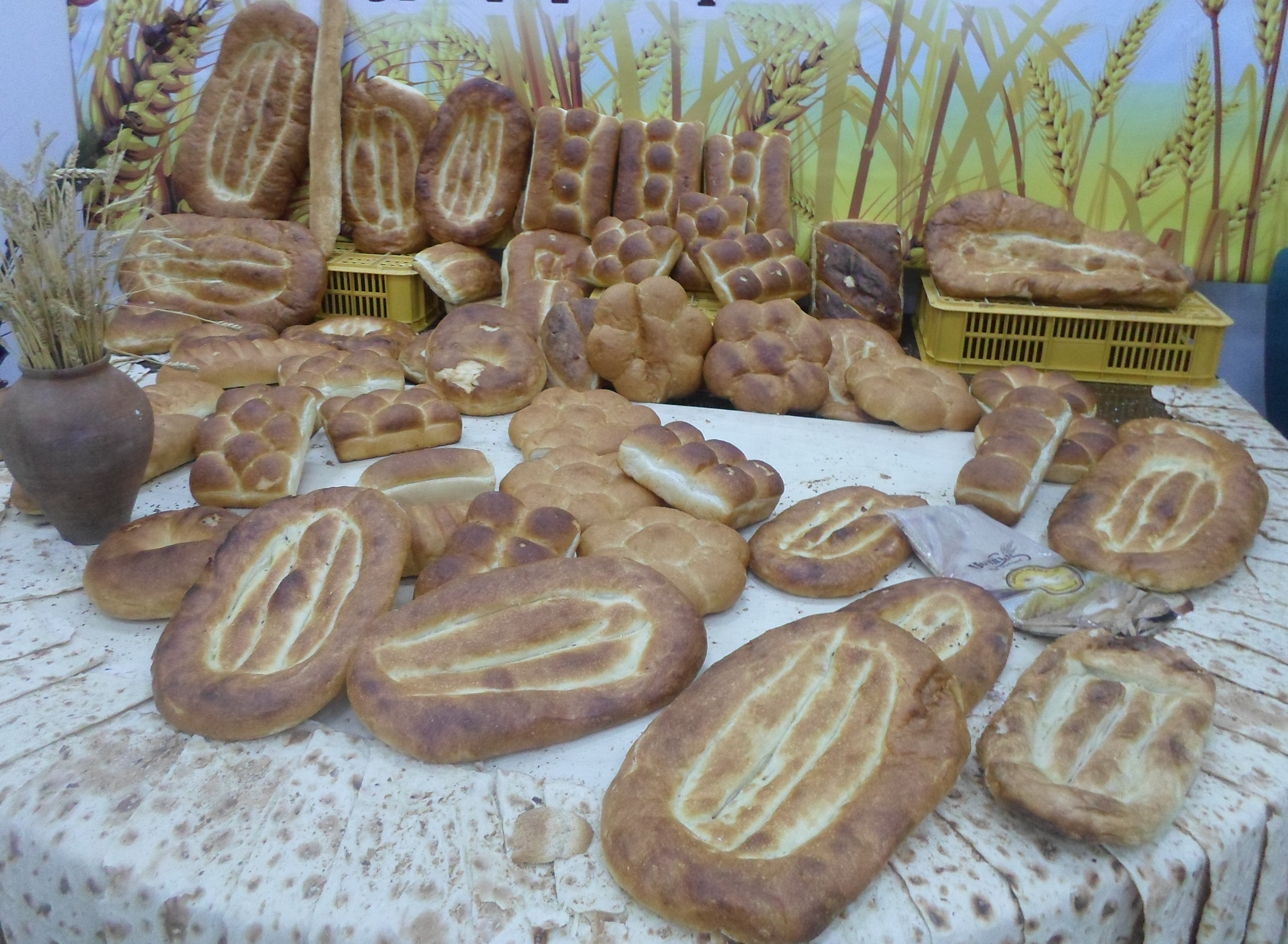

== See also ==
- Barbari bread from Iran
- Lavash, a thin unleavened flatbread from Armenia
- Manakish from the Levant
- Naan from India and Pakistan
- Pita
- Pizza from Italy
- Ramadan pita, a similar bread from Turkey
- Tonis puri from Georgia
