= Pită de Pecica =

Romanian bread

- Type: Bread
- Place of origin: Romania
- Region or state: Arad County

Pită de Pecica is a Romanian round bread, roasted directly on hearth, specific from the town of Pecica in Arad County.

Pită de Pecica has been submitted for a protected designation of origin (PDO) by European Union.

== See also ==
- Brioche
- List of breads
