= List of Canadian Americans =

This is a list of notable Americans of Canadian descent, including both original immigrants who obtained American citizenship and were the principal founders of the United States, and their American descendants.

== Americans of Canadian descent ==
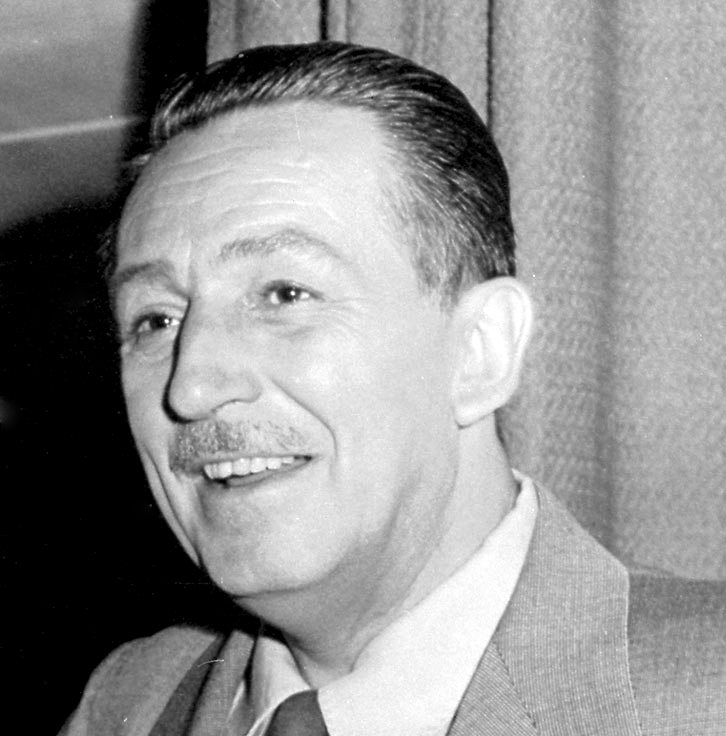
Walt Disney

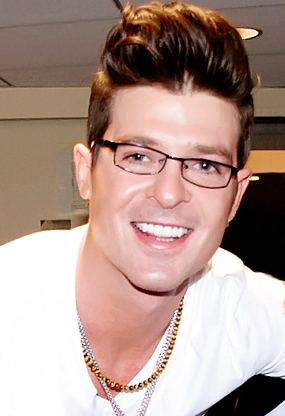
Robin Thicke

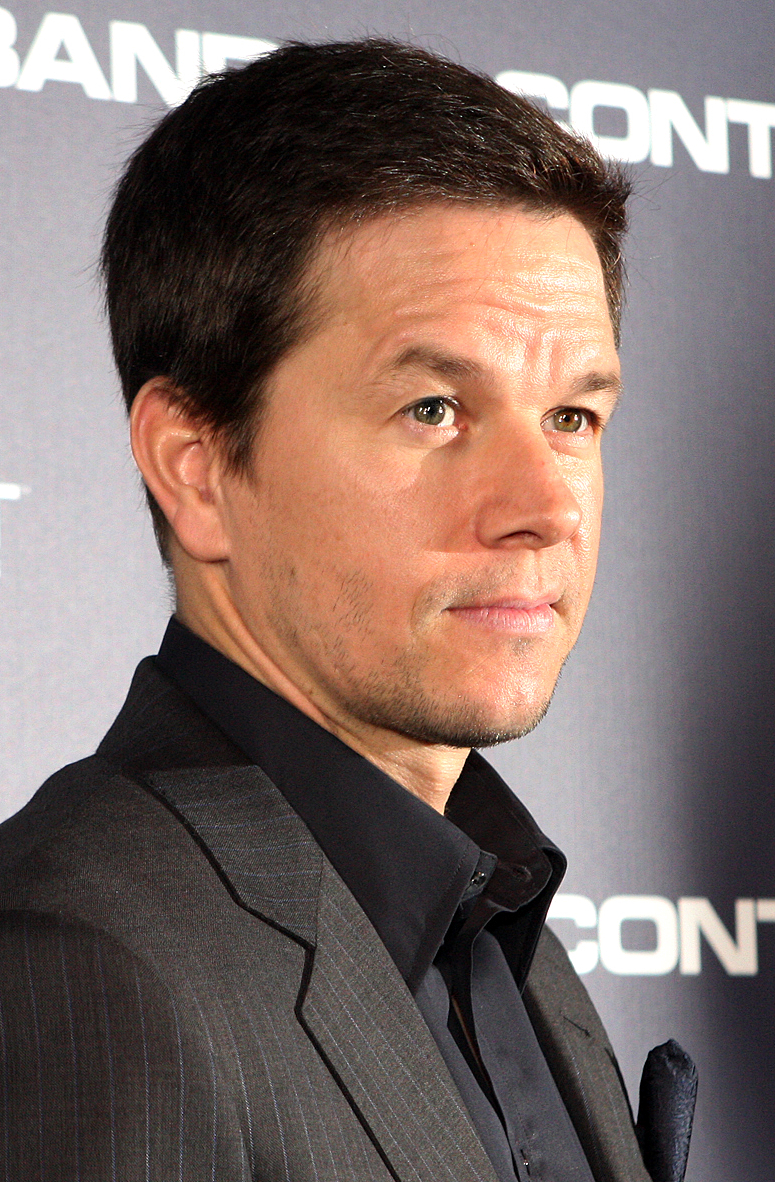
Mark Wahlberg

- Brendan Allen (born 1995), mixed martial artist
- Micah Ashman (born 2002), professional baseball player
- Earl W. Bascom (1906–1995), rodeo pioneer, inventor, actor, cowboy artist/sculptor, sports hall of fame inductee, father was Canadian citizen
- Drake Batherson (born 1998), ice hockey player
- Max Baucus (born 1941), politician, former long-time U.S. Senator from Montana (1978–2014), and former U.S. Ambassador to China (2014–2017)
- Warren Beatty (born 1937), actor and director
- Madonna (Madonna Louise Ciccone) (born 1958), singer-songwriter, dancer, actress, and businesswoman also known as "The Queen of Pop"
- Lady Gaga (born 1986), singer-songwriter, dancer, actress, and businesswoman also known as "The New Queen of Pop"
- John Cena (born 1977), professional wrestler and actor
- Kevin Chapman (born 1988), professional baseball player
- Walter Chrysler (1875–1940), automotive industry executive and founder of the Chrysler Corporation
- Andrew Clyde (born 1963), U.S. Representative from Florida (2023–present)
- Stephen Curry (born 1988), basketball player, 2024 olympic gold medalist in basketball
- Ayesha Curry (born 1989), actress and television personality
- Matt Davidson (born 1991), professional baseball player
- Roy Edward Disney (1930–2009), Walt Disney Company executive
- Walt Disney (1901–1966), animator, film producer, voice actor, and businessman, and founder of The Walt Disney Company
- Landon Donovan (born 1982), former professional soccer player
- Will Durant (1885–1981), historian and philosopher
- Thomas Edison (1847–1931), inventor
- Connor Fields (born 1995), lacrosse player
- Jane Fonda (born 1937), actress, activist
- Marcus Foligno (born 1991), ice hockey player
- Nick Foligno (born 1987), ice hockey player; older brother of Marcus Foligno
- Sam Forster (born 1996), writer, cultural critic, and war correspondent
- Jorja Fox (born 1968), actress
- Freddie Freeman (born 1989), baseball first baseman
- Missy Franklin (born 1995), Olympic gold medal-winning swimmer
- Brendan Fraser (born 1968), film and stage actor
- Elizabeth Furse (1936–2021), U.S. congresswoman from Oregon
- Kenny G (born 1956), musician
- Piper Gilles (born 1992), olympian; ice dancer
- Rene Gagnon (1925–1979), U.S. Marine hero
- Robert Goulet (1933–2007), singer and actor
- Mike Gravel (1930–2021), politician, former U.S. Senator from Alaska (1969–1981), and 2008 Democratic presidential candidate
- Natalie Gregory, actress
- Matt Groening (born 1954), cartoonist, writer, producer, animator, voice actor, and creator of The Simpsons
- Edwin S. Grosvenor (born 1951), editor, publisher, nonprofit manager
- Gene Hackman (1930-2025), retired actor and novelist
- Phil Hendrie (born 1952), radio personality and comedian
- Amy Jo Johnson (born 1970), actress
- Dwayne "The Rock" Johnson (born 1972), actor, semi-retired WWE wrestler, and producer
- Angelina Jolie (born 1975), actress, filmmaker, and humanitarian; one-quarter Canadian through her maternal grandfather
- Jack Kerouac (1922–1969), poet and writer
- Dalton Kincaid (born 1999), American football player (dual citizen born in the U.S.)
- Emeril Lagasse (born 1959), celebrity chef and restaurant entrepreneur ownership
- Paul LePage (born 1948), 74th Governor of Maine (2011 to 2019)
- Stephanie Lemelin (born 1979), actress and animal rights activist; Canadian through her father
- Brie Larson (born 1989), actress
- Paul "Triple H" Levesque (born 1969), retired professional wrestler and business executive
- Shirley MacLaine (born 1934), Hollywood actress and activist
- Josh Manson (born 1991), ice hockey player
- Rachel Maddow (born 1973), newscaster, journalist tv host
- Joel McHale (born 1971), comedian, actor, writer, television producer, and television host
- Grace Metalious (1924–1964), author
- Jeffrey Miron (born 1957), economist and professor at Harvard University
- Walter Mondale (1928–2021), politician, 42nd vice president of the United States, and 1984 Democratic presidential nominee
- Lisa Murkowski (born 1957), attorney and politician, US Senator from Alaska
- Elon Musk (born 1971), inventor, engineer, owner of SpaceX, Tesla Motors, and SolarCity, founder of X Corp.
- Tyler Myers (born 1990), ice hockey player
- Philip Nozuka, television actor
- Tyler Gregory Okonma (born 1991), rapper, singer, writer and producer; famously known as "Tyler, the Creator"
- Matthew Perry (1969–2023) actor, best known for his role as Chandler Bing on the long-running NBC television sitcom Friends.
- Lucas Pos (born 1998) professional football player who plays as a defender
- S. M. Stirling (born 1953), French-born author whose father descends from Canada; well known for his Draka series and later his Nantucket series and Emberverse series
- Angus Sutherland (born 1982), producer, actor and paternal half-brother of Kiefer Sutherland
- Sarah Sutherland (born 1988), actress and daughter of Kiefer Sutherland
- Jameson Taillon (born 1991), professional baseball player
- Jake Tapper (born 1969), author, journalist
- Robin Thicke (born 1977), R&B singer-songwriter
- John Thune (born 1961), Senate Majority Leader from South Dakota; mother and maternal grandfather were Canadian
- Rudy Vallée (1901–1986), saxophone player
- Vince Vaughn (born 1970), actor
- Betty White (1922–2021), actress, comedian
- Donnie Wahlberg (born 1969), singer
- Mark Wahlberg (born 1971), actor, and retired rapper

== Born in/lived in Canada, with American citizenship ==
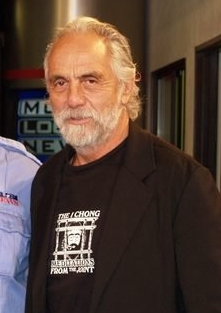
Tommy Chong

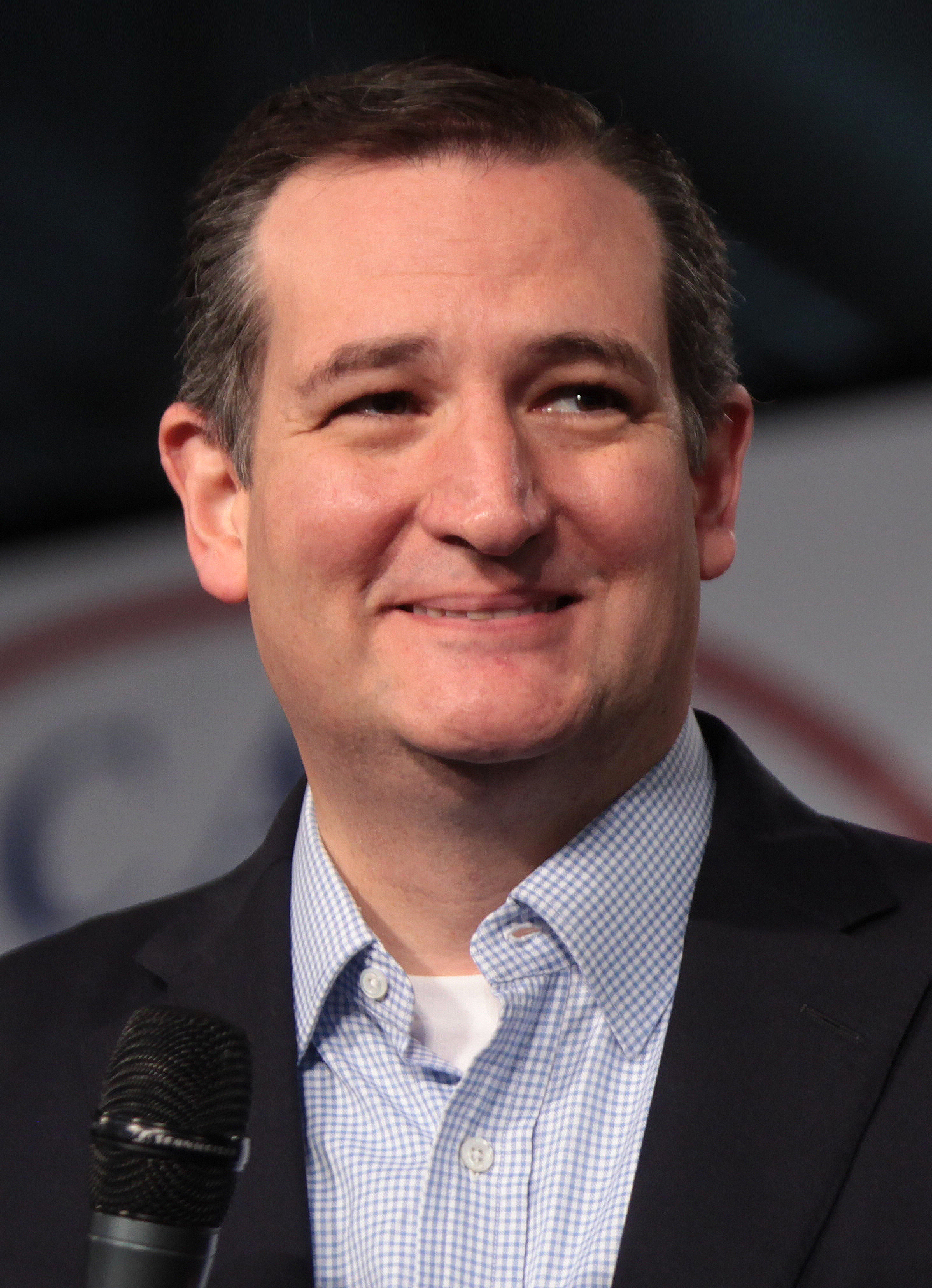
Ted Cruz

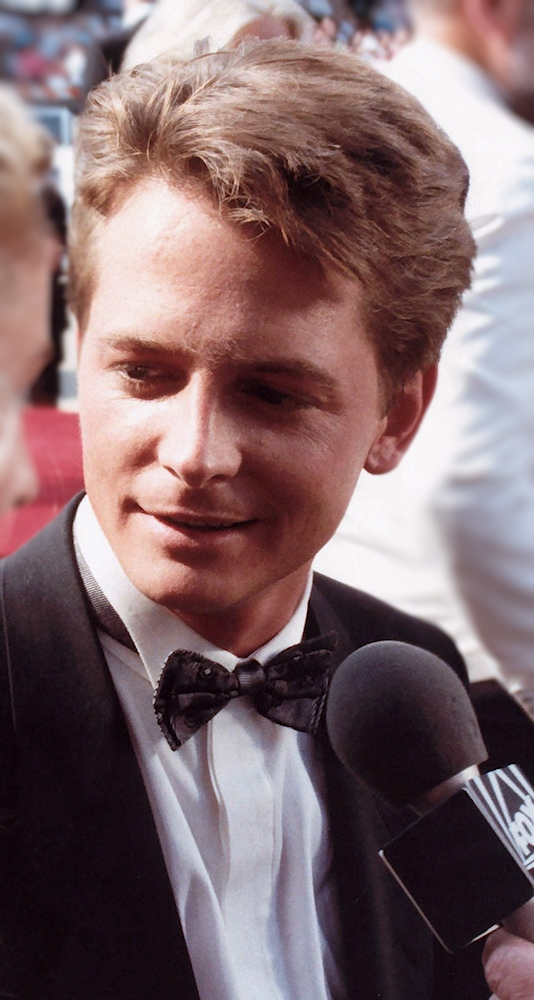
Michael J. Fox

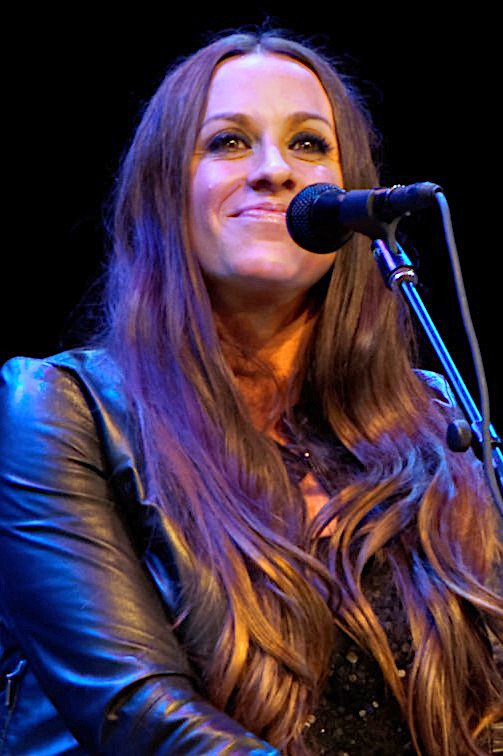
Alanis Morissette

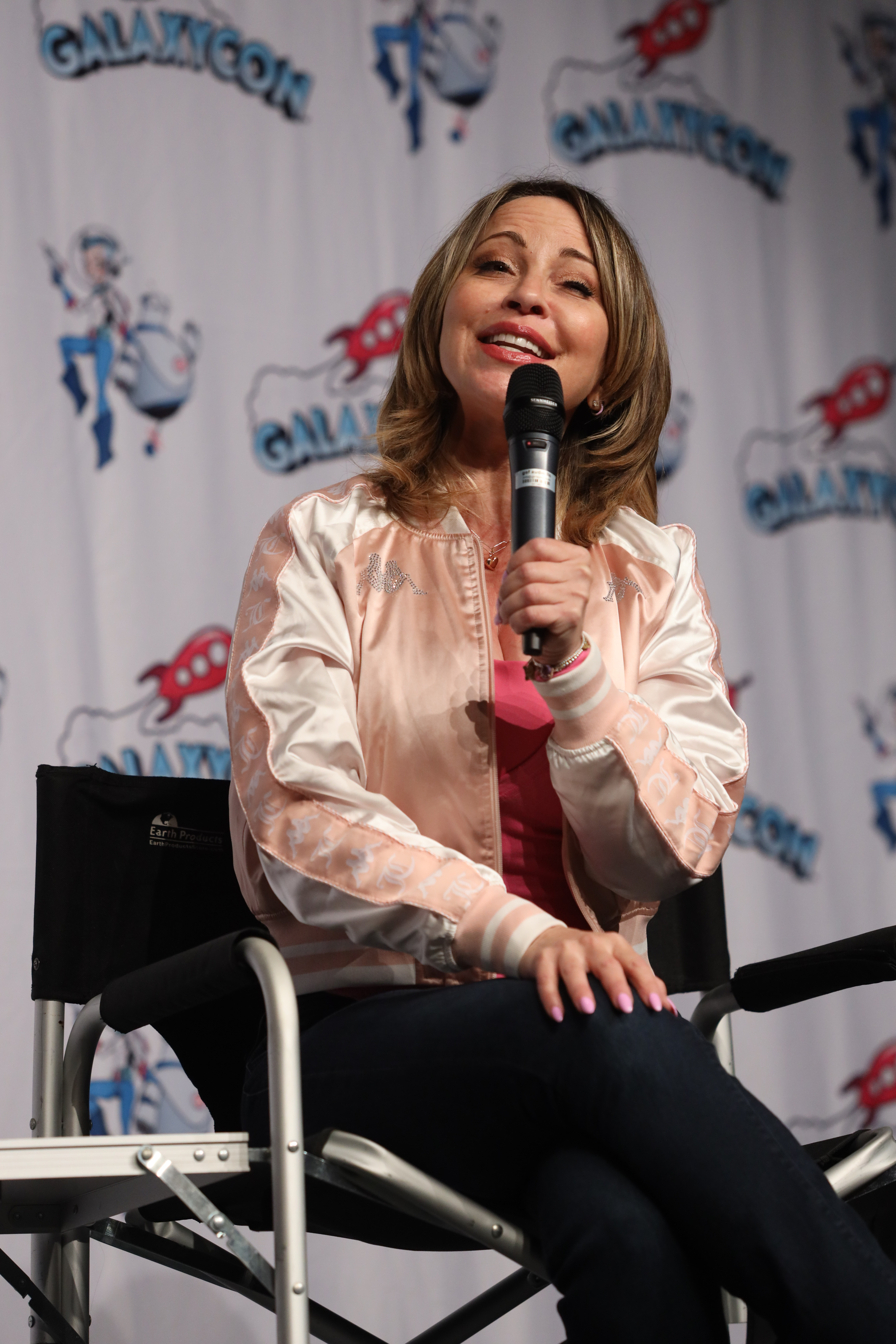
Tara Strong

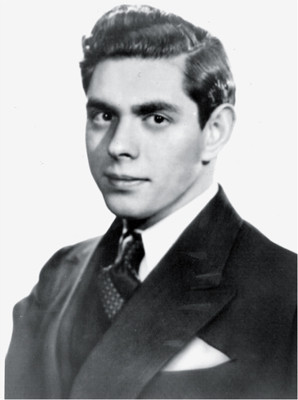
Joe Shuster

Peter Cullen

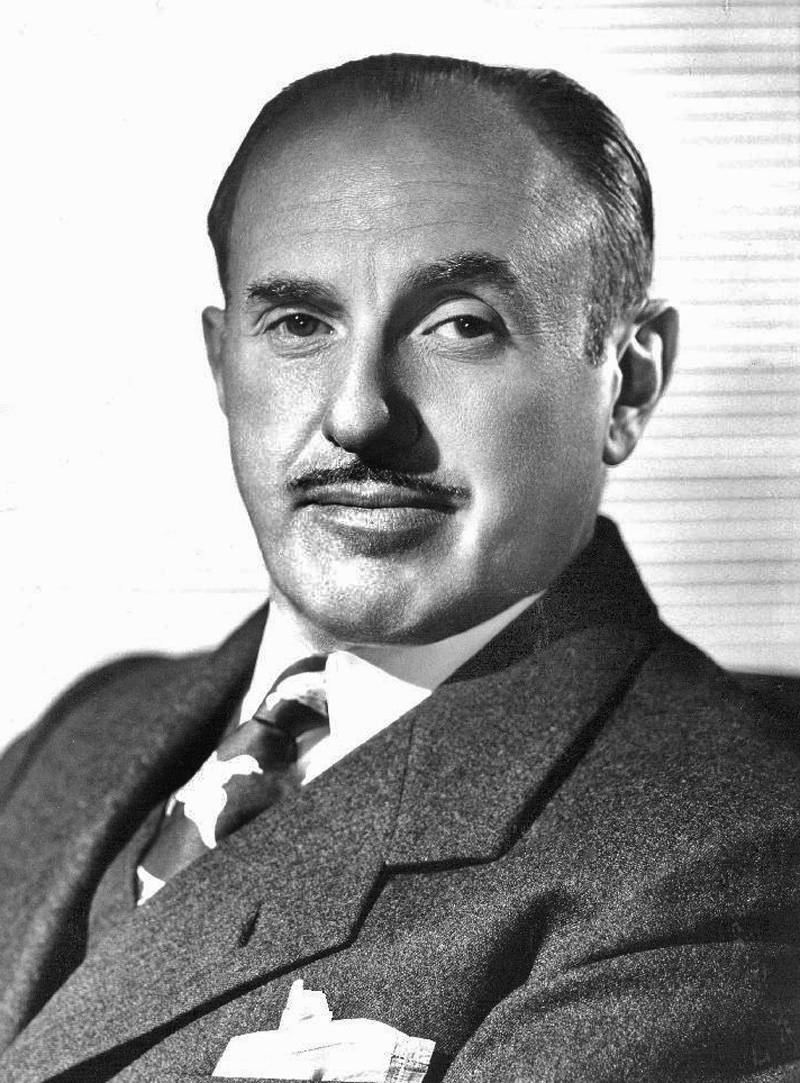
Jack L. Warner

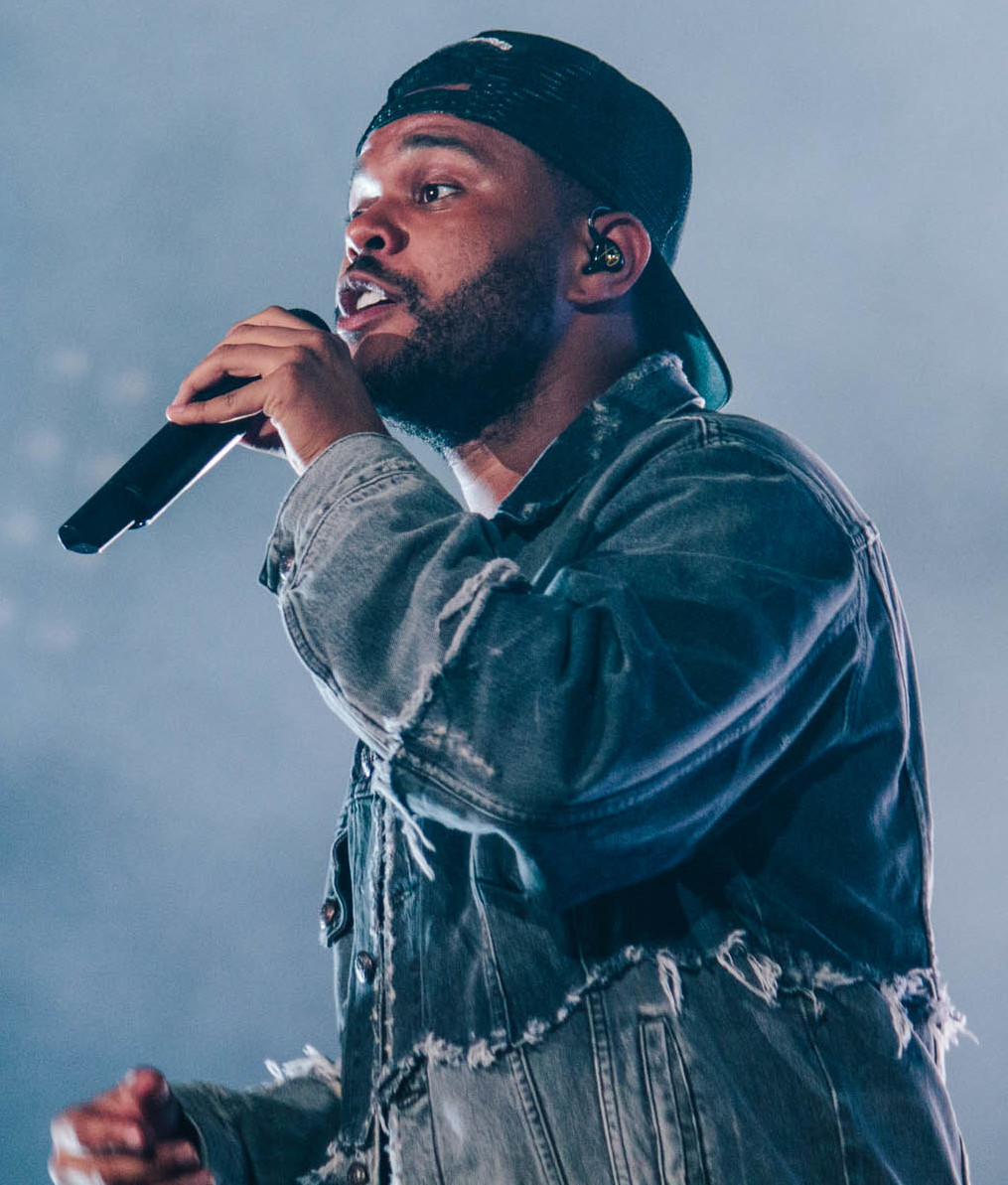
The Weeknd

- Charles Brent (1862–1929), bishop of the episcopal church, served in the Philippines, and helped founded establish St. Luke's Hospital (now St. Luke's Medical Center) as a healthcare mission.
- Jon Cooper (born 1967), canadian–american professional ice hockey coach who is the head coach for the Tampa Bay Lightning of the National Hockey League (NHL)
- Howie Mandel (born 1955) comedian, television personality, screenwriter, actor, producer, director, entrepreneur, game show host, and author
- Patrick J. Adams (born 1981), actor, photographer and director
- Lights (born 1987), singer, composer and rock star
- Neil Young (born 1945), singer and guitarist
- James Naismith (November 6, 1861 – November 28, 1939), inventor of basketball as a gym professor in Springfield Illinois in 1891
- John J. Adams (1848–1919), U.S. Congressman from New York (1883–1887)
- Foluke Akinradewo (born October 5, 1987), Volleyball player
- Stephen Amell (born 1981), actor best known for playing Oliver Queen, the title character in the TV series Arrow
- Nida Allam (born 1993), Durham County Commissioner
- Stephen Amell (born 1981), actor
- Pamela Anderson (born 1967), actress
- Paul Anka (born 1941), singer-songwriter and actor
- David H. Armstrong (1812–1893), U.S. Senator from Missouri (1877–1879)
- Will Arnett (born 1970), actor and comedian
- Dan Aykroyd (born 1952), actor and comedian
- Joby Baker, actor and entertainer (1934–2026)
- Frances Bay (1919–2011), actress, comedian
- Earl W. Bascom (1906–1995), rodeo pioneer, inventor, actor, artist/sculptor, hall of fame inductee, born in Utah and raised in Alberta, Canada
- David Baszucki (born 1963), entrepreneur, engineer, inventor, and co-founder and CEO of Roblox Corporation
- Brian Burke (born 1955), broadcaster
- Eric Bauza (born 1979), comedian and voice actor
- Sugar Lyn Beard (born 1981), actress, voice actress, television personality, and former host of YTV's The Zone from 2001–2007
- Justin Bieber (born 1994), singer
- Samantha Bee (born 1969), comedian, actress, writer, producer, political commentator, media critic and television host
- Alexander Graham Bell (1847–1922), Scottish-born inventor, scientist and engineer especially notable for inventing and patenting the first practical telephone; co-founded the American Telephone and Telegraph Company (AT&T) in 1885
- Frank Bell (1840–1927), Governor of Nevada, Lieutenant Governor of Nevada
- Manjul Bhargava (born 1974), Fields Medal winning mathematician at Princeton University
- Marty Biron (born 1977), ice hockey goaltender and commentator
- Joseph Edward Bland (1866–1945), former Michigan state senator and Michigan state representative
- Paul Boyd (born 1976), reporter
- Len Blum (born 1951), screenwriter, film producer, and film composer
- Azariah Boody (1815–1885), U.S. congressman from New York
- Brett Boyko (born 1992), professional football player with the B.C. Lions
- Dayana Cadeau (born 1966), Haitian-born Canadian/American professional bodybuilder
- Jim Carrey (born 1962), comedian and actor
- Sarah Carter (born 1980), actress, musician
- Kim Cattrall (born 1956), British born Canadian-American actress, became an official U.S. citizen in 2020
- Rae Dawn Chong (born 1961), actress and daughter of Tommy
- Tommy Chong (born 1938), comedian, actor, writer, director, activist, musician, and contestant from Dancing with the Stars season 19
- Emmanuelle Chriqui (born 1975), actress
- Kim Coates (born 1958), actor, Tig Trager from Sons of Anarchy
- Adam Cohen (born 1972), singer-songwriter, and son of Leonard
- Frank Henry Cooney (1872–1935), Governor of Montana (1933–1935), Lieutenant Governor of Montana (1933)
- Claire Corlett (born 1999), actress and singer, daughter of Ian James Corlett
- Ian James Corlett (born 1962), voice actor, musician, animator, and author
- Nazneen Contractor (born 1982), Indian-born actress
- James Couzens (1872–1936), U.S. Senator from Michigan (1922–1936), 47th Mayor of Detroit (1919–1922), 7th Commissioner of the Detroit Police Department (1916–1918)
- Laura Creavalle (born 1959), Guyanese-born Canadian/American female professional bodybuilder
- Sidney Crosby (born 1987), NHL ice hockey player
- Steven Crowder (born 1987), political commentator
- Rafael Cruz (born 1939), Cuban-born Canadian/American Christian preacher and public speaker; father of Ted
- Ted Cruz (born 1970), politician, U.S. Senator from Texas since 2013, and 2016 Republican presidential candidate
- Peter Cullen, (1941–2026), voice actor
- Ayesha Curry, actress and television personality
- Brian Daboll (born 1975), head coach of the NFL's New York Giants since 2022
- Geoff Davis (born 1958), politician and former U.S. Representative from Kentucky (2005–2012)
- Trevor Devall (born 1972), voice actor and podcaster, migrated to Los Angeles since 2013
- Chris Diamantopoulos (born 1975), actor and comedian
- Michael Donovan (born 1953), voice actor and director for many animated series and feature films
- Marie Dressler (1868–1934), actress
- Charles Aubrey Eaton (1868–1953), U.S. Representative from New Jersey (1925–1953)
- Jacob Falconer (1869–1928), U.S. Representative from Washington (1913–1915), Washington State Senator (1909–1913), Speaker of the Washington House of Representatives (1907–1909), Washington State Representative (1905–1909), 5th Mayor of Everett, Washington (1897–1899)
- Feist (Leslie Feist) (born 1976), singer-songwriter
- Andrew Feustel (born 1965), NASA geophysicist
- Nathan Fillion (born 1970), actor
- Brent Fitz (born 1970), musician and multi-instrumentalist
- Dave Foley (born 1963), actor, stand-up comedian, director, producer, and writer working out of both Canada and America with dual citizenship
- Mike Foligno (born 1959), former professional ice hockey player and coach; currently a scout for the Vegas Golden Knights; father of Nick and Marcus Foligno
- Sam Forster (born 1996), writer, cultural critic, and war correspondent
- Michael Fougere (born 1956), politician and Mayor of Regina, Saskatchewan since 2012
- David Foster (born 1949), arranger producer, songwriter, pianist, composer, musician and hitmaker
- Michael J. Fox (born 1961), actor, author, producer, and advocate
- David Frum (born 1960), speechwriter and journalist
- Baruch Frydman-Kohl, Canadian-American who serves as the Rabbi Emeritus of Beth Tzedec Congregation. In 2022, he was appointed as a Member of the Order of Canada.
- Jacob H. Gallinger (1837–1918), President pro tempore of the U.S. Senate (1912–1913), U.S. Senator from New Hampshire (1891–1918), U.S. Congressman from New Hampshire (1885–1889), New Hampshire State Senator (1878–1880), New Hampshire State Representative (1872–1873)
- John Garand, inventor of the M1 Garand rifle
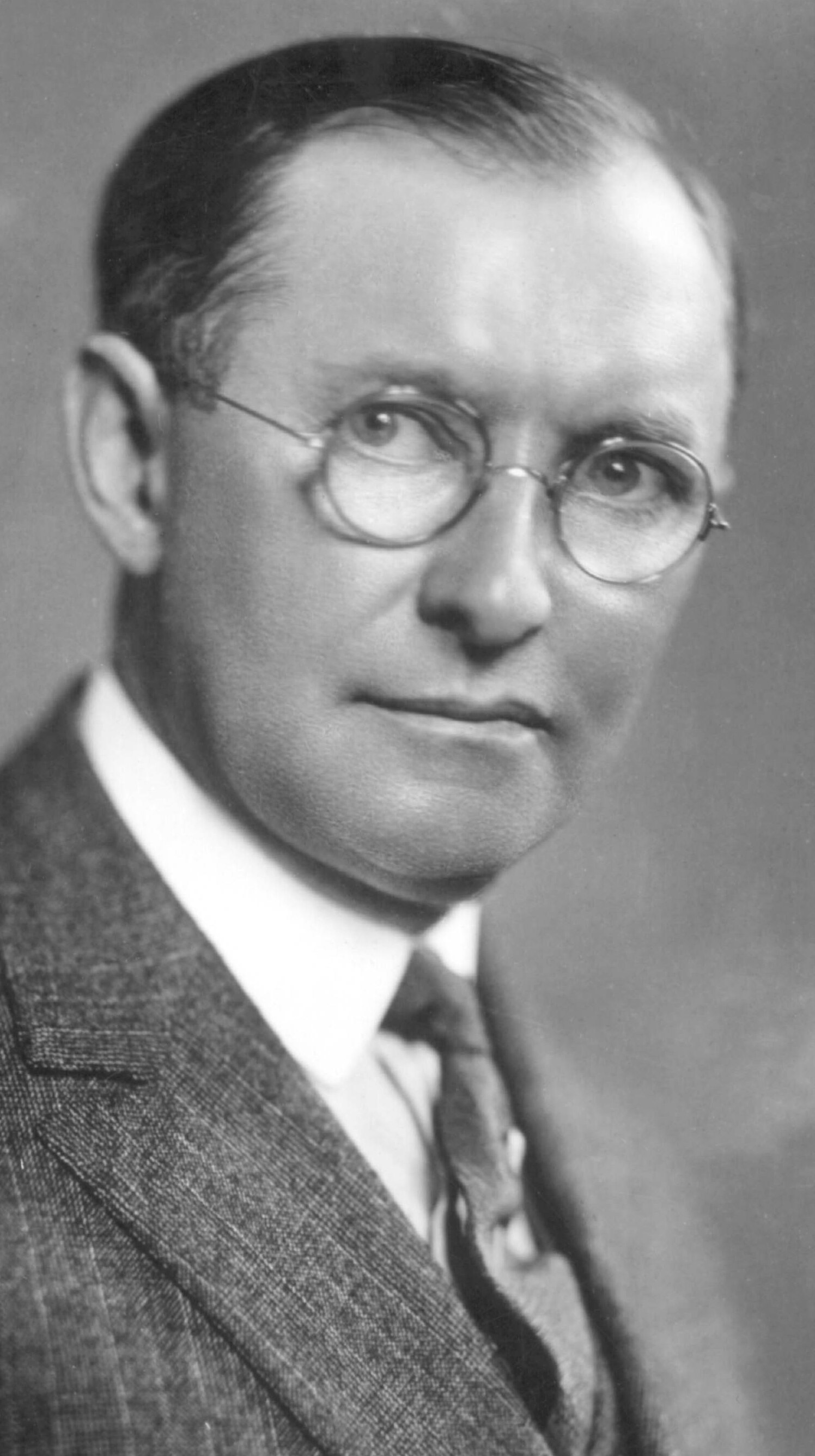
  James L. Kraft
- Victor Garber (born 1949), actor and singer
- Frank Gehry (born 1929), architect
- Giacomo Gianniotti (1989), actor
- Ryan Gosling (born 1980), actor
- Drake (real name Aubrey Graham) (born 1986), rapper, singer-songwriter, and former actor
- Jennifer Granholm (born 1959), former U.S. Secretary of Energy (2021–2025) and former Governor of Michigan (2003–2011)
- Wayne Gretzky (born 1961), retired ice hockey player; considered the greatest ice hockey player of all time
- Jennifer Hale (born 1965), voice actress for various film and television series
- Alexander M. Hardy (1837–1927), U.S. Congressman from Indiana (1895–1897)
- Winnie Harlow (born 1994), fashion model and public spokesperson on the skin condition vitiligo
- Bret Hart (born 1957), professional wrestler
- Owen Hart (1965–1999), professional wrestler
- Roland H. Hartley (1864–1952), Governor of Washington (1925–1933), Washington State Representative (1915–1917), Mayor of Everett, Washington (1910–1912)
- Phil Hartman (1948–1998), actor, comedian, screenwriter, and graphic artist
- David Archibald Harvey (1945–1916), U.S. Delegate from the Oklahoma Territory's at-large congressional district
- S.I. Hayakawa (1906–1992), U.S. Senator from California (1977–1983)
- Felix Hebert (1874–1969), Senate Minority Whip (1933–1935), U.S. Senator from Rhode Island (1929–1935)
- Tricia Helfer, (born 1974), actress
- Richard Conn Henry, (born 1940), astrophysicist
- Marieve Herington (born 1988), voice actress for various television films, anime, and series
- Sitara Hewitt (born 1981), actress
- Matt Hill (born 1968), comedian and voice actor for various television/cartoon series
- Jevon Holland (born 2000), American football safety for the Miami Dolphins
- Ernest "Tommy" Hughitt (1892-1961), professional football player
- Chris Irvine (born 1970), professional wrestler known as Chris Jericho; lead singer of Fozzy
- Rick Jeanneret (1942–2023), sportscaster (self-identified)
- Peter Jennings (1938–2005), TV journalist and anchor for ABC
- Avan Jogia, Canadian-born actor raised in America
- Amy Jo Johnson (born 1970), actress
- Jason Jones (born 1973), actor and comedian known for The Daily Show with John Stewart
- Cory Joseph (born 1991), basketball player
- Greg Kading (born 1963), former LAPD detective known for investigating the murders of Tupac Shakur and Biggie Smalls
- Ash Kalra (born 1972), California state assemblyman since 2016, former member of the San Jose City Council
- Stana Katic (born 1978), actress
- David Kaye (born 1964), voice actor most notable as Megatron in Beast Wars/Machines: Transformers, and in Transformers: Armada, Energon, and Cybertron
- John Kay (born 1944) singer and rock star
- Thomas Kearns (1862–1918), U.S. Senator from Utah (1901–1905)
- Brittany Kennell (born 1987), singer and contestant from NBC's The Voice season 10
- Donnie Keshawarz (born 1969), actor
- Kiawentiio (born 2006), actress and singer-songwriter
- Margot Kidder (1948–2018), actress and activist (father was American)
- Ben Klassen (1918–1993), former Florida State Representative and white supremacist leader
- James L. Kraft (1874–1953), entrepreneur known for being the first to patent processed cheese
- Chris Kunitz (born 1975), NHL ice hockey player
- Maurice LaMarche (born 1958), voice actor and comedian
- Franklin Knight Lane (1864–1921), former U.S. Secretary of the Interior, Interstate Commerce Commissioner and San Francisco City Attorney
- Angela Lee (born 1996), mixed martial arts female fighters
- Christian Lee (born 1998), mixed martial arts male fighter
- Rachelle Lefevre (born 1979), actress
- Ashley Leggat (born 1986), actress best known for her role as Casey McDonald from Life with Derek
- Mario Lemieux (born 1965), retired ice hockey player and current owner of the Pittsburgh Penguins
- Rejean Lemelin (born 1954), retired ice hockey goaltender and father of American actor, Stephanie Lemelin
- Stephanie Lemelin (born 1979), actress and animal rights activist; holding dual citizenship in Canada and the U.S.
- Sydney Leroux (born 1987), soccer player (father is American)
- Alexander Lewis (1822–1908), 37th Mayor of Detroit
- Shin Lim (born 1991), magician and winner of America's Got Talent season 13
- Guy Lombardo (1902–1977), bandleader and violinist
- Erica Luttrell (born 1982), Canadian-born actor, although American through her father; returned to America in the early 2000s
- Rachel McAdams (born 1978), actress
- William Lyon Mackenzie (1795–1861), Scottish-born Canadian/American journalist, politician, and the 1st Mayor of Toronto
- John C. Mackie (1920–2008), U.S. Representative from Michigan, 1965–1967, 9th Michigan State Highway Commissioner, 1957–1965
- Robert MacNeil (1931 – 2024), journalist, writer and television news anchor. He partnered with Jim Lehrer to create the landmark public television news program The Robert MacNeil Report in 1975. MacNeil co-anchored the program until 1995. The show eventually became the MacNeil/Lehrer NewsHour
- Sean Patrick Maloney (born 1966), politician and U.S. Representative from New York, 2013–2023
- Rizwan Manji (born 1974), actor
- Louis B. Mayer (1884–1957), film producer
- Eric McCormack (born 1963), actor, comedian, singer, voice actor
- Kevin McDonald (born 1961), Canadian-born actor, voice actor and comedian best known for his roles as Agent Wendy Pleakley in Lilo & Stitch franchise, Waffle in Catscratch, and Almighty Tallest Purple in Invader Zim
- Norm Macdonald (1959-2021), stand-up comedian, writer and actor notable as Norm the Genie in The Fairly OddParents
- Tom MacDonald (born 1988), political rapper, singer-songwriter, record producer and former professional wrestler
- James McMillan (1838–1902), U.S. Senator from Michigan (1889–1902)
- Tate McRae (born 2003), singer, songwriter, dancer and actress
- Joseph Medill (1823–1899), Mayor of Chicago (1871–1873)
- Shawn Mendes (born 1998), singer-songwriter
- Burt Metcalfe (1935–2022), television and film producer, director, and writer
- Joseph Millard (1836–1922), U.S. Senator from Nebraska (1901–1907), Mayor of Omaha, Nebraska (1872–1873)
- Joni Mitchell (born 1943), singer-songwriter and painter
- Frank C. Moore (1896–1978), Lieutenant Governor of New York (1951–1953), Comptroller of New York (1943–1950)
- Alanis Morissette (born 1974), singer-songwriter
- Kirby Morrow (1973–2020), actor and voice actor best known for voicing Hot Shot in Transformers: Cybertron and Miroku in the Inuyasha anime series.
- Caroline Mulroney (born 1974), Canadian lawyer and politician; Ontario's Minister of Francophone Affairs (2018–Present), Minister of Transportation (2019–Present) and Attorney General (2018–2019), Member of Provincial Parliament for York—Simcoe (2018–Present); daughter of 18th Prime Minister of Canada, Brian Mulroney; American citizenship by marriage to investment banker Andrew Lapham
- Elon Musk (born 1971), South African-born Canadian/American businessman, investor, engineer, and inventor; founder of Tesla Motors
- James E. Murray (1876–1961), politician and longtime U.S. Senator from Montana (1934–1961)
- Mike Myers (born 1963), Canadian-born British/American actor, comedian, screenwriter, and film producer
- Timothy Naftali (born 1962), historian
- James Naismith (1861–1939), inventor of basketball
- James Nesmith (1820–1885), U.S. Senator from Oregon (1861–1867), U.S. Congressman from Oregon (1873–1875), 4th Supreme Judge of the Provisional Government of Oregon (1844–1845)
- Samuel D. Nicholson, (1859–1923), U.S. Senator from Colorado (1921–1923)
- Leslie Nielsen (1926–2010), actor, comedian, and producer
- Justin Nozuka (born 1988), singer-songwriter
- Catherine O'Hara (1954–2026), actress, writer and comedian
- Sandra Oh (born 1971), actress
- Marie Owens (1853–1927), first female police officer in the US and in the Chicago Police Department who enforced child labor and welfare laws
- Elliot Page (born 1987) actor, film producer
- Josh Palmer (born 1999), American football wide receiver
- Dustin Penner (born 1982), ice hockey player
- Barry Pepper (born 1970), actor
- Frank Peppiatt (1927–2012), member of the variety show writing team Peppiatt and Aylesworth
- Mary Pickford, actress and film executive
- Jason Priestley (born 1969), actor and director
- Jim Peebles (born 1935), Winnipeg-born American/Canadian senior physicistian genius
- Jason Pominville (born 1982), ice hockey player with the Buffalo Sabres
- Aram J. Pothier (1854–1928), Governor of Rhode Island 1905–1915, 1925–1928), Lieutenant Governor of Rhode Island (1897–1898)
- James Randi (1928–2020), Toronto-born Canadian/American stage magician and scientific skeptic.
- David Reale (born 1985), actor, voice actor, and voice of Kai Hiwatari and Tsubasa Otori from the Beyblade anime series
- Leon Redbone (1949–2019), Cypriot-born Canadian-American singer
- Keanu Reeves (born 1964), actor
- Charles Revson (1906–1975) cosmetics pioneer, founder of Revlon
- Ryan Reynolds (born 1976), actor
- John Roberts (born 1965), journalist
- Alphonse Roy (1897–1967), U.S. Representative from New Hampshire, 1938–1939, New Hampshire State Representative, 1925–1931
- Caroline Rhea (born 1964), actor and comedian best known for her role as Hilda Spellman in Sabrina the Teenage Witch and Eugenia Scrimmage in the Bruno & Boots movie franchise
- Rino Romano (born 1969), actor
- Seth Rogen (born 1982), actor, comedian and filmmaker
- Jon Ryan (born 1981), professional football player with the Seattle Seahawks
- Joe Sakic (born 1969), retired hockey player and current general manager of the Colorado Avalanche
- Andrew Scheer (born 1979), politician, 35th Speaker of the House of Commons of Canada (2011–2015), former Leader of the Opposition (2017–2020) and Leader of the Conservative Party of Canada (2017–2020), Member of Parliament for
- Regina-Qu'Appelle (born 2004), natural-born American citizen by descent from father
- Jack Scott (1936–2019), singer-songwriter
- Drew Scott (born 1978), television personality; host of the various Property Brothers TV shows
- Jonathan Scott (born 1978), television personality; host of the various Property Brothers TV shows
- Pablo Schreiber (born 1978), actor
- Helen Shaver (born 1951), actress, director
- Mack Sennett (1880–1960), film director
- Patrick Sharp (born 1981), retired ice hockey player
- George Beverly Shea (1909–2013), gospel music singer-songwriter
- William Shatner (born 1931), veteran actor
- Melanie Shatner (born 1964), actress
- Helen Shaver, (born 1951), actress, film director
- Norma Shearer (1902-1983), actress
- Martin Short (born 1950), actor, comedian, singer, voice actor
- Joe Shuster (1914–1992), comic book artist, co-creator of Superman
- Lilly Singh (born 1988), YouTuber, actress, and current judge on Canada's Got Talent
- Vandana Slatter (born 1964), Washington state senator since 2025, former Washington state representative
- Cobie Smulders, (born 1982), actress
- Tyson Smith, (born 1983), Professional wrestler known as Kenny Omega
- Hank Snow (1914–1999), country music singer-songwriter
- David Sobolov (born 1964), voice actor and director most notable for his role as Drax the Destroyer
- Paul Stastny (born 1985), ice hockey player with the Vegas Golden Knights
- Jerry Simpson (1842–1905), U.S. Congressman from Kansas (1891–1895, 1897–1899)
- Stan Stephens (1929–2021), politician, broadcaster, and former Governor of Montana (1989–1993), President of the Montana Senate (1983–1985)
- Isaac Stephenson (1829–1918), U.S. Senator from Wisconsin (1907–1915), U.S. Congressman from Wisconsin (1883–1889), Wisconsin State Assemblyman (1866–1867, 1868–1869)
- Geoff Stirling (1921–2013), broadcaster and eccentric (born in the then-independent Dominion of Newfoundland)
- Tara Strong (born 1973), actress and voice actress
- Cree Summer (born 1969), voice actress for various film and television series, born in Los Angeles but raised in Toronto.
- Daniel Sutherland (1869–1955), U.S. Delegate from Alaska (1921–1931), President of the Alaska Territorial Senate (1915–1917), Alaska Territorial Senator (1931–1921)
- Brad Swaile (born 1976), voice actor best known for roles such as Light Yagami from Death Note, and Kicker Jones from Transformers: Energon
- John Swainson (1925–1994), Justice of the Michigan Supreme Court (1971–1975), Governor of Michigan (1961–1963), Lieutenant Governor of Michigan (1959–1961), Michigan State Senator (1955–1959)
- The Weeknd (real name Abel Tesfaye) (born 1990), singer-songwriter, record producer, and actor
- Daniel Thompson (1921–2015), inventor of the automatic bagel maker and the folding ping pong table
- Chantal Thuy (born 1990), actress
- Arthur H. Taylor (1852–1922), U.S. Congressman from Indiana (1893–1895)
- Chris Taylor Video Game developer known for Total Annihilation, Dungeon Siege, and Supreme Commander
- Robert Tinkler (born 1973), voice actor best known for roles such as Brooklyn Masefield and Gingka Hagane from the Beyblade anime series, Lync Volan from Bakugan: New Vestroia, and Crimson Rubeus from the DIC Entertainment dub of Sailor Moon
- Shania Twain (born 1965), pop/country singer
- Alex Trebek (1940–2020), former long-time host of the game show Jeopardy! from 1984-2020
- Charles W. Upham (1802–1875), Massachusetts State Representative, 1849, 1859–1860, Massachusetts State Senator, 1850, 1857–1858, President of the Massachusetts Senate, 1857–1858, U.S. Congressman from Massachusetts, 1853–1855, Member of the Massachusetts Constitutional Convention of 1853, 7th Mayor of Salem, Massachusetts, 1852–1853
- Ali Velshi (born 1968), television journalist, a senior economic and business correspondent for NBC News, and an anchor for MSNBC.
- Richard Verma (born 1968), politician and former U.S. Ambassador to India (2015–2017)
- Sam Vincent (born 1971), voice actor best known for roles such as Double D from Ed, Edd, n' Eddy, and the titular character from Martin Mystery
- Weston E. Vivian (1924–2020), U.S. Congressman from Michigan, 1965–1967
- Sugith Varughese, (born 1958), writer, director, and actor
- Jack L. Warner (1892–1978), film executive
- Marianne Meed Ward (born 1966), politician, journalist
- Oswald West (1873–1960), Governor of Oregon (1911–1915)
- Harland Williams (born 1962), actor, comedian, author, artist, singer, musician, and radio personality
- Calum Worthy (born 1991), actor, writer, and producer most notable as Dez on Austin & Ally
- Samantha Win (born 1991), actress and wushu taolu athlete
- Katheryn Winnick (born 1977), actress and director
- Chase G. Woodhouse (1890–1984), U.S. Congresswoman from Connecticut, 1945–1947, 1949–1951, Secretary of State of Connecticut, 1941–1943
- Fay Wray (born 1907), actor and author, Wray became a naturalized American citizen in 1933
- Jason Wu (born 1982), Taiwanese-born Canadian/American fashion designer; dress designer of former First Lady Michelle Obama
