= 1960 in science =

The year 1960 in science and technology involved some significant events, listed below.

== Astronomy and space exploration ==
- April 8 – Project Ozma, under the direction of astronomer Frank Drake at the National Radio Astronomy Observatory in Green Bank, West Virginia, commences the first modern search for extraterrestrial intelligence (SETI) experiment.
- April 13 – The U.S. Navy Transit satellite 1B is successfully launched by a Thor-Ablestar rocket leading to the first successful tests of a satellite navigation system.
- June 22 – The U.S. Navy SOLRAD 1 Galactic Radiation and Background program satellite is successfully launched by the same Thor-Ablestar rocket as Transit 2A, serving as the first successful U.S. reconnaissance satellite and returning the first real-time X-ray and ultraviolet observations of the Sun.
- August 11 – The return capsule of the U.S. Discoverer 13 Corona mission is successfully recovered from the Pacific Ocean, the first time any man-made object has been recovered successfully from orbit.
- September – A Soviet SS-2 Sibling missile is successfully launched in a suborbital test from Jiuquan Satellite Launch Center, the first Chinese spaceflight.
- October 4 – The U.S. Army Courier 1B, the world's first active communications repeater satellite, is launched into low Earth orbit.

== Biology ==
- February 13
  - Max Perutz publishes the structure of hemoglobin.
  - John Kendrew publishes the structure of myoglobin.
- March 5 – British marine biologist Sir Alister Hardy announces his aquatic ape hypothesis, theorising that swimming and diving for food exerted a strong evolutionary effect partly responsible for the divergence in the common descent of humans and other great apes.
- April – Robin Hill and Fay Bendall publish the 'Z scheme' of electron transport in photosynthesis.
- July – Robert Burns Woodward publishes a total synthesis of chlorophyll.
- July 14 – English primatologist Jane Goodall arrives at what will become Gombe Stream National Park in Tanganyika to begin her groundbreaking behavioral study of chimpanzees in the wild.
- November 4 – At the Kasakela Chimpanzee Community, Jane Goodall observes a chimpanzee using a grass stalk to extract termites from a termite hill, the first recorded case of tool use by animals.
- December 10 – The first underwater park within the United States, the John Pennekamp Coral Reef State Park, is formally dedicated; it covers 178 square miles (460 km^{2}) and protects coral reefs, seagrass and mangroves inside its boundaries.
- Czech biochemist Emil Paleček discovers that nucleic acids can be studied through electrochemistry, contradicting previous assumptions that DNA molecules are too large to have electrochemical properties and allowing them to be used in the diagnosis of genetic disorders.
- Jacques Ruffié invents blood typing.
- Juan Oro finds that concentrated solutions of ammonium cyanide in water can produce the nucleotide adenine.
- Four independent researchers (Sam Weiss, Jerard Hurwitz, Audrey Stevens and J. Bonner) discover the bacterial RNA polymerase that regulates the polymerization of nucleotides under the control of DNA.
- Climatron geodesic dome greenhouse opens at the Missouri Botanical Garden in St. Louis.

== Computer science ==
- August – Edsger W. Dijkstra and Jaap A. Zonneveld produce the first (X1) implementation of the ALGOL 60 programming language.
- John McCarthy of MIT publishes the Lisp programming language.

== Earth sciences ==
- May 22 – Valdivia earthquake: Chile's subduction fault ruptures from Talcahuano to the Taitao Peninsula (with its epicenter near Lumaco), causing the most powerful earthquake on record (with a magnitude of 9.5) and a tsunami.
- Harry Hammond Hess proposes the concept of seafloor spreading.

== Exploration ==
- January 23 – Jacques Piccard and Don Walsh reach bottom in the Mariana Trench in United States Navy bathyscaphe Trieste at a depth of 10,916 m.
- May 10 – The nuclear submarine USS Triton, under the command of Captain Edward L. Beach Jr., completes the first underwater circumnavigation of the Earth.

== Mathematics ==
- August 23 – Hans Peter Luhn receives United States Patent No 2,950,048 for a "computer for verifying numbers", the Luhn algorithm. Assigned to the IBM Corporation, the checksum formula provides a method for validating credit card numbers.
- Wacław Sierpiński proves the existence of Sierpinski numbers.
- Stanko Bilinski rediscovers the Bilinski dodecahedron.
- In the classification of finite simple groups, Michio Suzuki and Rimhak Ree introduce Suzuki–Ree groups; and John G. Thompson, Walter Feit and Marshall Hall prove that a group with a fixed-point-free automorphism of prime order is nilpotent, and that all finite simple CN groups of odd order are cyclic.
- C. A. R. Hoare invents the quicksort algorithm.
- Irving S. Reed and Gustave Solomon present the Reed–Solomon error correction code.

== Medicine ==
- April 15 – William C. Chardack implants the first fixed-rate cardiac pacemaker with mercury battery, designed by Wilson Greatbatch.
- May 2 – The first coronary artery bypass surgery is performed by a team led by Dr. Robert Goetz and thoracic surgeon Dr. Michael Rohman with the assistance of Drs. Jordan Haller and Ronald Dee at the Albert Einstein College of Medicine–Bronx Municipal Hospital Center in the United States using internal mammary artery as the donor vessel; the patient survives for 9 months.
- May 9 – The U.S. Food and Drug Administration announces that it will approve birth control as an additional indication for G. D. Searle's Enovid, making it the world's first approved combined oral contraceptive pill.
- June 6 – The American Heart Association announces a strong statistical association between heavy cigarette smoking and coronary heart disease.
- October – Christopher Wagner and colleagues demonstrate a causal connection between exposure to crocidolite (fibrous riebeckite) (blue asbestos) and the lung cancer mesothelioma.
- c. October – First trials of measles vaccine carried out in Nigeria and elsewhere.
- October 2 – Methicillin-resistant Staphylococcus aureus (MRSA), the antibiotic-resistant form of bacteria, is first isolated by Dr. M. Patricia Jevons in samples from a hospital in southeastern England.
- October 30 – The first kidney transplantation in the United Kingdom is performed by a team led by English surgeon Michael Woodruff at the Royal Infirmary of Edinburgh between identical twins.

== Meteorology ==
- April 1 – The United States launches the first weather satellite, TIROS-1.

== Metrology ==
- October – 11th General Conference on Weights and Measures establishes the International System of Units, abbreviated SI from the French name, Le Système international d'unités.

== Paleontology ==
- November 4 – OH 7, first fragments of Homo habilis, discovered by Jonathan Leakey at Olduvai Gorge, Tanzania.

== Physics ==
- March 22 – Arthur Leonard Schawlow and Charles Hard Townes receive the first patent for a laser.
- May 16 – Theodore Maiman demonstrates the first working laser, a ruby laser, at Hughes Research Laboratories.

== Psychology ==
- Harrison G. Gough and Alfred B. Heilbrun Jr. introduce the Adjective Check List to assess psychological traits of an individual.

== Technology ==
- A tungsten halogen lamp bulb is patented by General Electric engineer Fredrick Moby.
- Prototype Pentax Spotmatic single-lens reflex camera, pioneering through-the-lens metering, is presented.
- A bagel machine is patented by Daniel Thompson in the United States.

== Awards ==
- Nobel Prizes
  - Chemistry – Willard Libby
  - Physics – Donald A. Glaser
  - Physiology or Medicine – Frank Macfarlane Burnet, Peter Medawar
- Copley Medal (Royal Society of London) – Harold Jeffreys
- Vetlesen Prize (geology; first award) – Maurice Ewing
- Wollaston Medal (Geological Society of London) – Cecil Edgar Tilley

== Births ==
- March 20
  - Norbert Pohlmann, German computer scientist.
  - Yuri Shargin, Russian cosmonaut.
- May 3 – Jaron Lanier, American computer scientist.
- May 7 – Ara Darzi, Baron Darzi of Denham, Iraqi-born British surgeon and politician.
- July 8 – Yann LeCun, French computer scientist.
- July 28 – Harald Lesch, German physicist
- October 18 – Craig Mello, American biologist.
- December 4 – Fred Ramsdell, American immunologist, winner of the 2025 Nobel Prize in Physiology or Medicine.
- December 24 – Carol Vorderman, British mathematician.

== Deaths ==
- January 21 – Wu Lien-teh (born 1879), Malayan Chinese physician.
- March 27 – Gregorio Marañón (born 1879), Spanish physician, scientist, historian and philosopher.
- April 24 – Max von Laue (born 1879), German physicist, winner of the 1914 Nobel Prize in Physics.
- May 8 – J. H. C. Whitehead (born 1904), British mathematician.
- June 17 – Sir Harold Gillies (born 1882), New Zealand-born plastic surgeon.
- August 10 – Oswald Veblen (born 1880), American mathematician, geometer and topologist.
- September 22 – Melanie Klein (born 1882), Austrian-British psychoanalyst.
- December 8 – Ross T. McIntire (born 1889), American naval surgeon.
