= Knight Commission =

The Knight Commission on Intercollegiate Athletics, often referred to simply as the Knight Commission, is an independent leadership group of academic, athletic, and sports leaders with an eye toward leading reforms whose purpose is to develop, promote, and lead transformational change that prioritizes the education, health, safety, and success of college athletes.

The Commission is positioned as a trusted resource for leaders and decision-makers in college sports, including university and industry leaders and most recently, U.S. Congress.

== History and Formation ==
The Commission was founded by the John S. and James L. Knight Foundation, which was itself founded by brothers John S. Knight and James L. Knight, members of the founding family of what became the Knight Ridder newspaper and broadcasting chain. The Commission first met in 1989 after a series of scandals in college sports. The founding co-chairmen of the Commission were Reverend Theodore M. Hesburgh, president of the University of Notre Dame, and William C. Friday, former president of the University of North Carolina system.

As an independent group, the Knight Commission has no official connection to governing bodies such as the National Collegiate Athletic Association (NCAA), the primary sanctioning body for college sports in the United States, or any government agencies. But because of its blue ribbon panel and high profile within the news media, the Commission's work carries considerable influence within college sports as a whole.

== Legacy of Impact ==
Since its inception, the NCAA has adopted a number of Commission recommendations, particularly those that strengthened academic standards. Some of the key areas of impact include:

- Academic reforms: The Knight Commission released its landmark report in 1991 calling for major academic reforms to improve graduation rates. Over the following three decades, the NCAA implemented various policies leading to record-high graduation rates. In 2011, the NCAA adopted the Knight Commission’s seminal recommendation that teams must be on track to graduate at least 50% of their players in order to be eligible to compete in an NCAA championship.
- Governance and Independent Directors: In 2013, the Knight Commission called on the NCAA to expand its governing board to include athletes and independent directors. In 2018, the Commission on College Basketball, led by former Secretary of State Condoleezza Rice, advanced the recommendation to add independent directors to the highest governing board, which the NCAA implemented the following year.

== Current Priorities ==
The Knight Commission’s current work is focused on a number of key priorities and initiatives, including federal legislation education efforts and the C.A.R.E. Model framework.

=== Federal Legislation Education Efforts ===
Beginning in 2025, several Congressional bills were introduced to impact college sports. The Commission produced several resources and hosted national meetings to inform all stakeholders about the proposed bills and their impact on college sports.

=== C.A.R.E. Model Framework ===
In September 2021, the Commission released a major proposal to more closely connect the distribution and spending of shared athletics revenues with the broad educational mission of college athletics programs. The Connecting Athletics Revenues with the Educational Model of College Sports (C.A.R.E.) Model report recommended altering both the distribution criteria and uses of funds for more than $3.5 billion distributed annually by the NCAA, CFP, and Division I conferences. This C.A.R.E. Model is the newest set of recommendations in the Knight Commission’s “Transforming the D-I Model” series.

The Commission’s proposed requirements could be imposed either by Congress or the respective college sports governing bodies. The C.A.R.E. Model requires that four core principles guide both the distribution criteria and accountability for how shared athletics revenues are spent.

Those core principles are:

- Transparency;
- Independent oversight;
- Incentives for Core Values of Education, Gender Equity, and Opportunity;
- Financial Responsibility for Education, Health, Safety, and Well-Being.

In 2024, the Commission began to offer C.A.R.E. Model Conference grants of up to $25,000 for Division I conferences that exemplify C.A.R.E. Model principles. Five conferences have been awarded grants and named C.A.R.E. Champions for 2026-2027- America East Conference (2025 and 2026), the Metro Conference (2024, 2025 and 2026), the Patriot League (2025 and 2026), The Southern Conference (2024, 2025 and 2026), and The Summit League (2025 and 2026). The Big Sky Conference was a repeat C.A.R.E. Champion for 2024 and 2025.

== Additional Initiatives ==
=== 2025 Division I leaders Survey and Public Opinion Poll ===
In 2025 the Knight Commission and Elon University Poll conducted both a national public opinion poll and a national survey of NCAA Division I university presidents, athletics directors and other campus athletics leaders.

The public opinion poll showed that the American public is divided on athlete compensation and employment, and the governance of college sports, but are unified in support of academic standards and the importance of college athletics opportunities in all sports. The Division I leaders survey revealed deep concerns over direction of Division I sports, financial stability and the impact of the House v. NCAA settlement, but also highlighted nearly unanimous support for maintaining academic mission and standards.

Results, particularly from the Division I leaders survey, continue to inform key priorities for the Commission, particularly around educating stakeholders, including congress, regarding current and recommended frameworks and reforms for college sports.

=== Transforming the NCAA D-I Model Series ===
In late 2019, the Commission announced a comprehensive examination of new models to restructure college sports, citing the challenges created by the “highly commercialized environment” for Football Bowl Subdivision (FBS) football and some NCAA Division I sports, particularly men’s basketball. This resulted in several recommendations, a series of public forums, and a culminating report in 2020, Transforming the NCAA D-I Model.

The transformational recommendations included:

- Allowing college athletes to earn compensation from third parties for the use of their name, image, and likeness (NIL): In April 2020, a year and a half before the NCAA changed its rules allowing college athletes to receive compensation from third parties for the use of their name, image and likeness (NIL), the Commission recommended five principles to guide the development of such policies. The Commission’s principles also influenced the Uniform Law Commission’s NIL Act.
- Changing the NCAA’s revenue distribution system: The NCAA revenue distribution formula should count ONLY sports for which the NCAA operates a post-season championship and controls revenues associated with that championship consistent with its guidelines. This change would result in the sport of FBS football no longer receiving an exemption to count in the NCAA’s revenue distribution formula. The sport of FBS football is recognized and incentivized by the separate revenue distribution formula controlled by the College Football Playoff LLC.
- Restructuring Division I college sports: Create a new entity, completely independent of the NCAA and funded by the College Football Playoff (CFP) revenues, to govern the sport of football in the Football Bowl Subdivision (FBS). The new governing entity would oversee all FBS football operations, including its national championship, and manage all issues related to FBS football athlete education, health, safety, revenue distribution, litigation, eligibility, and enforcement.
- Reorganizing NCAA Division I governance: The NCAA should govern and conduct national operations and championships under a reorganized governance system for all Division I sports, including football at the Football Championship Subdivision (FCS) level, but excluding what is now FBS football. Governance and oversight of football in NCAA Divisions II and III should remain unchanged.
- Adopting governance principles to maintain college athletics as a public trust: The NCAA and the new FBS football entity should adopt governing principles, to maintain college athletics as a public trust, rooted in the mission of higher education. Those principles must prioritize college athletes’ education, health, safety, and success in the operation of intercollegiate athletics. Regardless of the sport or governance entity, college presidents and chancellors should be responsible and accountable for the conduct of all intercollegiate athletics programs at their institutions.

This was a major study and series of reports examining the overall NCAA Division I model, focusing especially on the impact of NCAA FBS football on D-I sports as a whole.

=== Finances of College Sports ===
The Commission has also led several initiatives to provide greater financial transparency for college sports:

- In 2013, the Commission launched the first-of-its-kind financial database tracking academic and athletics finances for Division I institutions, the College Athletics Financial Information (CAFI) Database. In March 2022, the Commission partnered with the S.I. Newhouse School of Public Communications at Syracuse University to manage the database, rebranded as the Knight-Newhouse College Athletics Database.
- In 2017, the Knight Commission’s efforts led to the NCAA changing its annual financial report to require separate reporting for bonuses paid to college football coaches for postseason appearances and wins instead of grouping those bonuses with other postseason expenses.

== Key Reports ==
- First report: Keeping Faith with the Student Athlete
- Second report: A Call to Action
- Third report: Restoring the Balance
- Fourth major study and series of reports: Transforming the NCAA D-I Model Series
- Fifth report: Achieving Racial Equity in College Sports

=== First report: Keeping Faith with the Student Athlete ===
The Commission issued its groundbreaking report, Keeping Faith with the Student Athlete: A New Model for Intercollegiate Athletics in 1991. In the report, the Knight Commission proposed a major overhaul in the way colleges run their athletic departments, proposing what it called the “one-plus-three” model — in which the “one,” control by the college president, is directed toward the “three” goals of academic integrity, financial integrity and independent certification. The report was influential in the implementation of many reforms by the NCAA, including a major restructuring within the NCAA itself, when in 1996 the governance of the association was taken away from college athletic directors and put into the hands of college presidents.

=== Second report: A Call to Action ===
In 2001, the Commission issued its second major report, A Call to Action: Reconnecting College Sports and Higher Education, which reiterated almost all of the original report's recommendations.

One notable recommendation was that the NCAA restrict participation in postseason to teams whose graduation rate is 50 percent or greater, a concept that influenced the development of NCAA academic policies and, ultimately, its 2011 adoption of an academic threshold for postseason competition.

=== Third report: Restoring the Balance ===
The Knight Commission’s third report Restoring the Balance: Dollars, Values, and the Future of College Sports was released in 2010. It calls for strengthening accountability through transparency, rewarding practices that make academics a priority, and treating athletes as students first.

The report also recommended that a portion of the NCAA financial incentives reward academic outcomes. The NCAA adopted changes to its revenue distribution formula in 2016 to reward academic outcomes.

=== Fourth major study and series of reports: Transforming the NCAA D-I Model Series ===
"Transforming the NCAA D-I Model" was an examination of the overall NCAA Division I model, focusing especially on the impact of NCAA FBS football on D-I sports as a whole.

=== Fifth report: Achieving Racial Equity in College Sports ===
In May 2021, the Commission released its Achieving Racial Equity in College Sports Report. The report highlights opportunities and steps to move toward fulfilling the goal of equitable treatment, and places special emphasis on moving from pledge to policy and advocacy to action.

One of the recommendations calls on the NCAA to eliminate the use of standardized test scores for initial athletics eligibility requirements in NCAA Divisions I and II, a recommendation that was advanced within the NCAA legislative process.

== Current commission members and staff ==
As of 2024, the Commission's co-chairs are Pamela Bernard, former vice president and general counsel, Duke University, and Len Elmore, senior lecturer at Columbia University, attorney, former ESPN analyst and former standout basketball player for the University of Maryland, the NBA and the ABA. The Commission's CEO is Amy Privette Perko, who is a member of the Wake Forest University Sports Hall of Fame and previously worked in college sports at the University of Kansas and at the NCAA.

Members (alphabetical by last name):

- Jonathan Alger, Inaugural America 250 Fellow; Former university president, James Madison University, American University
- Eric Barron, interim president, University Corporation for Atmospheric Research (UCAR); president emeritus, Pennsylvania State University; former president Florida State University
- Kevin Blue, CEO and general secretary, Canada Soccer
- Jill Bodensteiner, commissioner, Horizon League
- Bob Bowlsby, former commissioner, Big 12 Conference
- Beth Brooke, director, The New York Times Company, eHealth, Lehigh Valley Health Network, SHEEX, and The United States Olympic and Paralympic Committee (USOPC); former women's basketball player, Purdue University
- David L. Foster, general partner and general counsel, TFO Equity; President, St. James Advisory Group; & Of Counsel, Ivie McNeill Wyatt Purcell & Diggs former track athlete, Princeton University
- Dr. Wayne Frederick, interim president, Howard University
- Amy Huchthausen, chief operating officer, Stavvy
- Oliver Luck, president of Palmetto Trust Company, college and professional sports executive, West Virginia University and NFL player
- Jacques McClendon, vice president, football coaching operations, WME University of Tennessee and NFL player
- Jessica Mendoza, television analyst, ESPN; former Olympic medalist and softball All-American
- Kim Ng, commissioner, Athletes Unlimited Softball League; former team general manager, Major League Baseball
- Dr. Judy D. Olian, president, Quinnipiac University
- Charles Olson, trustee, John S. and James L. Knight Foundation
- Jill Pilgrim, managing attorney, Pilgrim & Associates Arbitration, Law & Mediation LLC
- Kirk Schulz, Professor of Chemical Engineering, Washington State University; Former university president, Washington State and Kansas State University
- Kendall Spencer, Georgetown University law graduate, former NCAA board member, former track & field athlete, University of New Mexico

Member, ex-officio

- Maribel Pérez Wadsworth, president and CEO, John S. and James L. Knight Foundation

Past co-chairs:

- Thomas K. Hearn Jr. – chair, February 2005 – May 2006
- Clifton R. Wharton Jr. – co-chair, May 2006 – April 2007
- R. Gerald Turner – co-chair, May 2006 – Dec. 31, 2015
- William E. “Brit” Kirwan – co-chair, April 2007 – Dec. 31, 2015; chair, Jan. 1, 2016 – Dec. 31, 2016
- Carol Cartwright – co-chair, Jan. 1, 2017 – Dec. 31, 2020
- Nancy Zimpher – co-chair, Jan. 1, 2021 – Dec. 31, 2022
- Arne Duncan – co-chair, Jan. 1, 2016 – Dec. 31, 2023

Founding co-chairs

- Rev. Theodore M. Hesburgh, C.S.C., president emeritus, The University of Notre Dame, founding co-chair, 1989-2001
- William C. Friday, president emeritus, University of North Carolina, founding co-chair, 1989-2001
