= Ireland's Great Hunger Museum =

Coordinates: 41.4052°N 72.8984°W

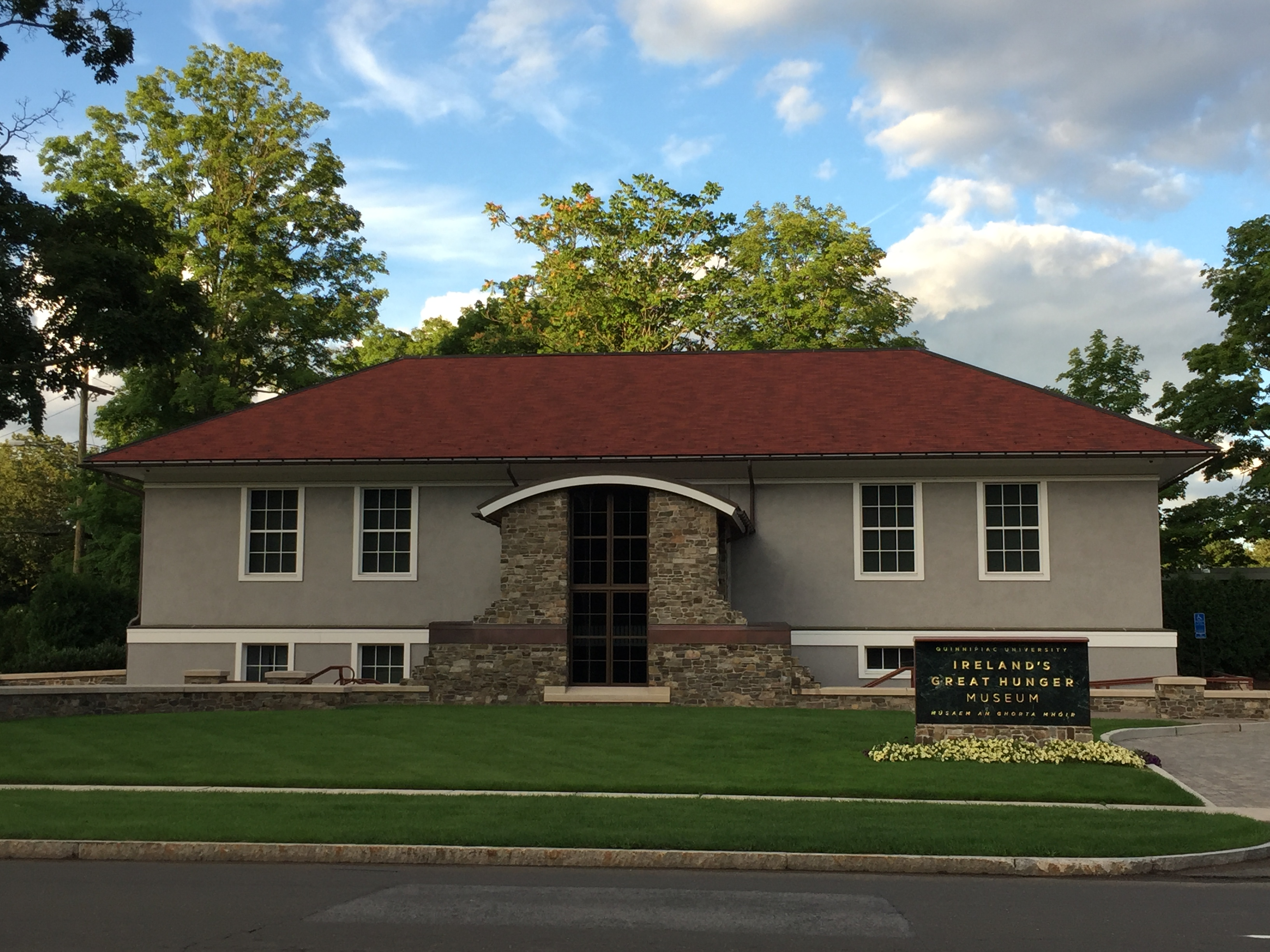
- Established: 2012
- Dissolved: 2021
- Location: 3011 Whitney Avenue; Hamden, Connecticut, United States
- Type: Art museum, history museum
- Owner: Quinnipiac University
- Website: ighm.org

Ireland's Great Hunger Museum (Irish: Músaem An Ghorta Mhóir) was founded in 2012 in Hamden, Connecticut, as part of Quinnipiac University, to document and educate the public on the Irish Great Famine of 1845–1852, as well as its causes and consequences. In addition to literature and artifacts, the museum contains the world's largest collection of Great Hunger-related art by both contemporary and 19th-century Irish and Irish-American artists.

A small sister gallery, containing literature and statues related to the Famine, is located within a special section of the Arnold Bernhard Library on the Mount Carmel campus of Quinnipiac University itself.

== History ==
The 8th President of Quinnipiac University John L. Lahey became invested in the history of the Famine in the 1990s. As encouraged by Murray Lender, Lahey began collecting artworks and documents related to the Famine. Ireland's Great Hunger Museum opened its doors in October 2012 at the site of a former public library and office building renovated into a museum space by Wyeth Architects. Grace O'Sullivan of NCAD in Dublin was the museum's inaugural curator, author Christine Kinealy its director, and Grace Brady of the Met its executive director.

Lahey stepped down from his position as president in 2018. By 2019, the museum was facing a lack of support and revenue. These problems were worsened by the COVID-19 pandemic and in August 2021, the university's board of trustees announced the museum would remain closed following a vote.

This decision has been met with ongoing opposition. Donors grew concerned over the fate of the artifacts in the museum, with some calling on the state attorney general's office to intervene. Lahey called it "disappointing and perplexing". A Norwalk-based committee Save Ireland's Great Hunger Museum was formed, who wrote an open letter to Lahey's successor Judy Olian and have held in-person demonstrations. The university released a statement assuring that the collection would not be sold and that a search for a new institution interested in publicly displaying it was underway.

In March 2022, it was announced the collection would move to Fairfield in partnership with the Gaelic-American Club (GAC), a plan that was unanimously voted for by the Quinnipiac Board of Trustees. A selective exhibition opened temporarily on Old Post Road that September and October, pending establishment of the new museum site. It is now coordinated as the Ireland’s Great Hunger Museum of Fairfield.

== Collection ==
Works by noted contemporary Irish artists in the museum's permanent collection include the sculptors John Behan, Rowan Gillespie and Éamonn O'Doherty and the contemporary visual artists Robert Ballagh, Alanna O'Kelly, Brian Maguire and Hughie O'Donoghue. Featured paintings include 19th- and 20th‐century works by artists such as James Brenan, Daniel Macdonald, James Arthur O'Connor and Jack B. Yeats.

Ireland's Great Hunger Museum at Quinnipiac University publishes a series of booklets called Famine Folios covering many aspects of the Famine in Ireland from 1845 to 1852. The essays are interdisciplinary in nature, and make available new research in Famine studies by internationally established scholars in history, art history, cultural theory, philosophy, media history, political economy, literature and music.

This publication's initiative was devised to augment the museum experience, and is part of the museum's commitment to making its collection accessible to audiences of all ages and levels of educational interest. The pamphlets are produced to the highest level, beautifully illustrated with works from the museum and related collections. It ensures that audiences have access to the latest scholarship as it pertains to both the historical and contemporary dimensions of the collection.
