= Lender's Bagels =

Brand of bagels

- Product type: Bagels
- Current owner: Bimbo Bakeries USA (Grupo Bimbo)
- Introduced: 1927 in New Haven, Connecticut
- Previous owners: Kraft (1984–1996); Kellogg's (1996–1999); Aurora Food (1999–2003); Pinnacle Foods (2003–2018); Conagra Brands (2018–2020)
- Website: www.lendersbagels.com

Lender's Bagels is a brand of bagels that pioneered the pre-packaged bagel industry in the United States. Established in 1927 in New Haven, Connecticut, by the Lender family, it became a North American leader in the marketing, distribution and sales of bagels. Lender's introduced frozen bagels and sold the first packaged bagels in supermarkets, eventually becoming the world's biggest bagel producer. The company was sold to Kraft Foods in 1984. In 2003, it became part of Pinnacle Foods. In 1994 it began production of room-temperature fresh bagels. In 2012, Lender's revenue was about $70 million.

In 2018 Pinnacle Foods was sold to Conagra, which then sold Lender's Bagels out of Pinnacle to Bimbo Bakery.

== History ==
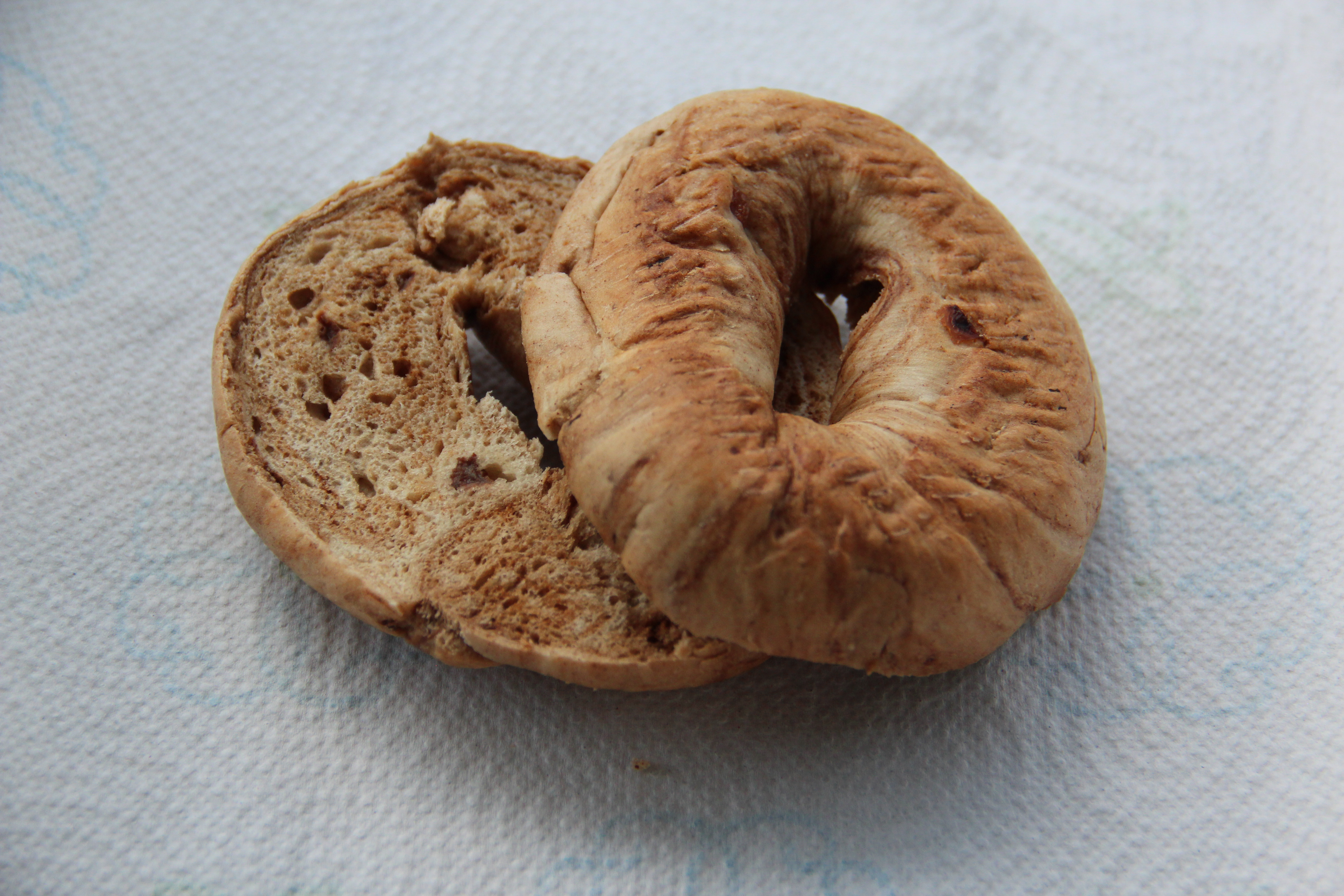
Lender's Cinnamon Raisin Swirl bagels

=== Beginnings ===
Lender's Bagel Bakery was established by Harry Lender, a Jewish baker originally from Chelm, Poland. He had immigrated to the United States from Lublin in August 1927. His surname is a transliteration of the Yiddish word meaning "countryman" or "person living in a rural area" (cf. modern German Länder). After first working in a bagel bakery in Passaic, New Jersey, Lender purchased his own bakery on Oak Street in New Haven, Connecticut, for $600. He arranged for his family to join him in the United States, and they arrived on December 30, 1929.

New Haven then had a population of over 162,000, many of them new immigrants. The Jewish population of 25,000 made up almost one-sixth of the population. Lender's bagel bakery, called the "New York Bagel Bakery", was one of the first bagel bakeries in the United States to be established outside New York City. In 2007, the site of the first Lender's bagel bakery was dedicated as a playground; it was named after one of Harry Lender's sons: “Murray Lender Playground”.

In 1934, Lender moved to a large former Italian bakery, in a multi-ethnic neighborhood of New Haven. Aside from sales to individuals, Lender sold his bagels to other bakeries, as well as to delicatessens and restaurants. As the largest sales of bagels came on Sunday morning, Saturday night was the busiest time at the bakery. People of all ethnicities, even from out of town, began to stop by the bakery on Saturday nights to purchase fresh bagels.

=== New processes lead to growth ===
By the mid-1950s, the logistics of producing as many as 6,000 bagels for sale on Sunday morning, in contrast to relatively low activity the rest of the week, began to demand a solution. As a result, in 1954 Lender perfected a method of freezing the bagels, so that the labor could be spread more evenly throughout the week. He kept this process a secret, but after two years, the bakery accidentally delivered frozen bagels, and the secret was revealed. Customers were initially angry, but were won over, when they realized that these were the same bagels they had been satisfied with for the previous two years. The New York Bagel Bakery started to market the frozen bagels, including delivery outside New Haven, for instance to resorts in the Catskills that were popular among Jews.

Lender developed further refinements, such as pre-slicing the bagels and packing them in polyethylene bags to keep them fresh after thawing. The bakery began selling the packaged frozen bagels in supermarkets. To introduce bagels to an unfamiliar public, the Lender family would prepare and distribute them in supermarket aisles. The plastic bagged, frozen six pack of pre-sliced Lender's Frozen Bagels began to gain market share, and by 1959 supermarket sales accounted for half of the sales. His business created new varieties of bagels, and production was switched to rotary ovens, rather than the labor-intensive open, flat ovens.

In 1960, Harry Lender died. His sons Sam and Murray, who had been running the bakery with him, continued. (The oldest son Hyman had previously left the family business.) When youngest son Marvin graduated from college, he became a partner as well, and shortly thereafter Sam retired. The two brothers teamed up to expand operations, with Marvin managing the bakery and Murray in charge of sales.

In 1963 the Lenders leased the very first Thompson Bagel Machine, invented by Daniel T. Thompson. Until then, according to Thompson:

Sam Lender mixed the bagel dough and one man cut it into small slabs and fed it into an Italian breadstick machine. The Italian breadstick machine made bagel dough strips that were then distributed to workstations where six to eight men rolled them by hand into bagels. With this system they averaged 50 dozen bagels per hour per man. The first Thompson machine, with three unskilled workers, was able to do the work of eight skilled workers.

=== Large-scale expansion ===
In 1965 the bakery, now renamed "Lender's Bagel Bakery", moved to a 12,000-square-foot (1,100 m^{2}) plant on the Boston Post Road in West Haven, in order to have ample reserve capacity for expansion. Business increased so quickly that the bakery was working at full capacity within a year. The Lenders began flash-freezing the bagels and produced softer and sweeter bagels than was traditional.

In 1974, Lender’s had bought their major competitor, Abel's Bagels in Buffalo, New York. In 1978 the family opened a bagel restaurant in Orange, Connecticut, under the name “H. Lender and Sons”; two years later they opened a second one in Hamden. After Lender's Bagels was sold to Kraft Foods, the name of the restaurant was changed to S. Kinder Restaurants. The name is derived from Yiddish esst, kinder, meaning eat, children.

Under Marvin and Murray Lender, Lender's Bagels eventually grew to a highly automated 25,000-square-foot (2,300 m^{2}) bakery, pioneering the modern automated bagel bakery. The company grew from six employees when it moved to West Haven to 600 in 1984, selling about $60 million worth of bagels from four bagel factories producing more than 750,000,000 bagels a year, becoming the world's biggest bagel producer.

== Marketing ==
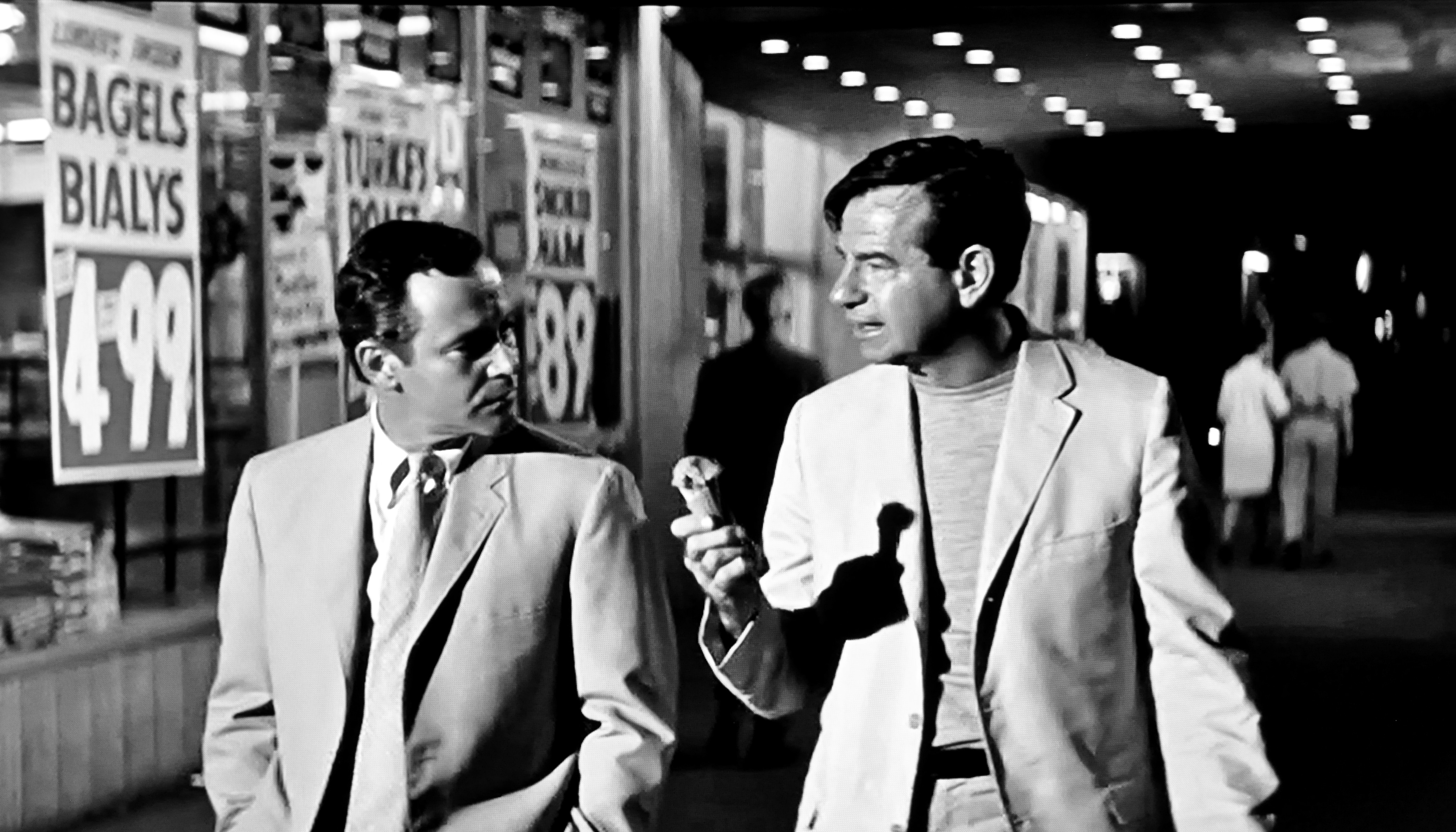
In the first case of product placement, Lender's Bagels appears in The Odd Couple

Murray Lender's marketing promotions put bagels into the public consciousness. He was traveling throughout the United States marketing Lender's Frozen Bagels to a country which was disdainful of frozen foods and unfamiliar with bagels. In response to observations that March was the slowest month for sales of frozen foods, Murray Lender led an effort to declare March as Frozen Foods Month, raising sales dramatically. In recognition of his contributions to the industry as a whole, he was elected chairman of the National Frozen Food Association, nominated to the Halls of Fame of the International Deli-Bakery Association, and the Frozen Food Association. In response to the public's growing consciousness of health foods and the drop in popularity of white bread, he began to stress bagels as more natural baked goods, and Lender's Bagels became one of the first products to voluntarily include nutritional information on the package.

In a 1997 New York Times article, Eric Asimov described what he called the "informal border separating the land of fresh bagels from the frontier of the frozen assembly-line product made by Lender's Bagels" as "the Lender's Line." Murray Lender appeared as a guest on The Tonight Show Starring Johnny Carson. He created green bagels for Saint Patrick's Day, oval bagels for President Lyndon B. Johnson to be photographed eating in the Oval Office, and "bagel heads", miniature decorated bagels, in the likeness of the world leaders attending the 9th G7 summit in 1983. In the late 1980s and early 1990s, a cartoon mascot, "BagelBird", was featured on t-shirts and other mail-order merchandise to promote the brand. When he died at age 81 on March 21, 2012, the Washington Post called him "the most important man in the modern history of bagels," adding "Lender’s bagels may taste like white bread with a hole, but what they lack in authenticity they make up for in meaning."

== New ownership ==
In the spring of 1984, the Lender family sold Lender's Frozen Bagels to Kraft Foods, with the stipulation that Marvin would remain president and Murray spokesman for the next two years. Murray Lender publicized the sale in characteristic form, by holding "the marriage of the century", with Murray and Marvin escorting a 6-foot-tall (1.8 m) Lender’s Bagel, "Len", down the aisle to meet his new bride, "Phyl", a Kraft Philadelphia brand cream cheese. In 1987, Lender's had three plants in West Haven, a plant in New Haven, one in Buffalo, New York, and one in Mattoon, Illinois; the last is the site of the annual "Bagelfest", and also the only surviving Lender's Bagel plant in operation today. Kraft, which reportedly spent $12 to $15 million annually to advertise Lender's bagels, sold the company to Kellogg Company in 1996 for $455 million. Analysts criticized Kellogg's investment in a frozen product at a time when the popularity of fresh bagels was rising. Kellogg's introduced a $20 million television campaign for Lender's in Fall 1997. In October 1999, Kellogg's sold the business to San Francisco based Aurora Foods for $275 million, and ceased production at the New Haven factory in March 2000. In 2003, Aurora was bought by Pinnacle Foods, a subsidiary of the Blackstone Group since 2007.

As of 2013, the Lender's Bagels brand is in production with a wide variety of bagels, including a Healthy Grain bagel brand containing more dietary fiber and protein than the company’s other bagels. In 2011, Lender’s revenue was $40.9 million from the sale of 23.4 million six-bagel packages, $12.7 million from the sale of 7.6 million units of frozen bagels, and $28.2 million from the sale of 15.8 million units of refrigerated bagels. According to SymphonyIRI Group, a Chicago-based market research firm, Lender’s is the top selling brand in each segment. In 2012, Lender's Bagels sales increased to more than $70 million.

In May 2012, Consumer Reports magazine rated Lender's Original as one of the best bagels sold by American fast-food chains and grocery stores, an assessment criticized by many commentators – especially in New York – who argued that only fresh bagels are real bagels.

== See also ==
- List of brand name breads
