= Alanna O'Kelly =

Irish artist (born 1955)

- Born: 1955 (age 70–71); Gorey, County Wexford, Ireland
- Other name: Alannah O'Kelly
- Education: National College of Art and Design; Slade School of Fine Art
- Known for: performance art, installation art
- Notable work: Chant Down Greenham; The Country Blooms, a Garden and a Grave; Sanctuary/Wastelands; Omós
- Elected: Aosdána (1996)

Alanna O'Kelly (/æˈlɑːnə/, also spelt Alannah; born 1955) is an Irish artist, active in performance art and installation art, as well as sculpture, song, land art and film. She is a member of Aosdána, an elite association of Irish artists.

== Biography ==
O'Kelly was born in Gorey in 1955. She studied at the Regional Technical College Galway, National College of Art and Design (NCAD, Dublin) and the Slade School of Fine Art (London).

Her 1990 work The Country Bloom, A Garden and a Grave was described by Stephanie McBride as "[reconfiguring] Achill's topography through image and text to present a narrative of local loss, mourning and Famine memories." It was selected by The Irish Times as part of "Modern Ireland in 100 Artworks."

She represented Ireland at the 1996 São Paulo Art Biennial and was elected to Aosdána that same year. She performed a traditional keen at the "funeral" of Patrick Ireland in 2008. This performance was highly praised, The Recorder: A Journal of the American Irish Historical Society saying "The keening by Alannah (O'Kelly) was wordless and tore right down to your root. It was one of the most extraordinary things, perhaps the most extraordinary, I've ever heard. It's still in my ears. It remains present to me." Aosdána says that her work "explores ideas of the psychic conflicts of our shared history and the continuity of tradition."

Her work is held at the Irish Museum of Modern Art and Ireland's Great Hunger Museum (Connecticut).
