= Murray Lender =

American businessman (1930–2012)

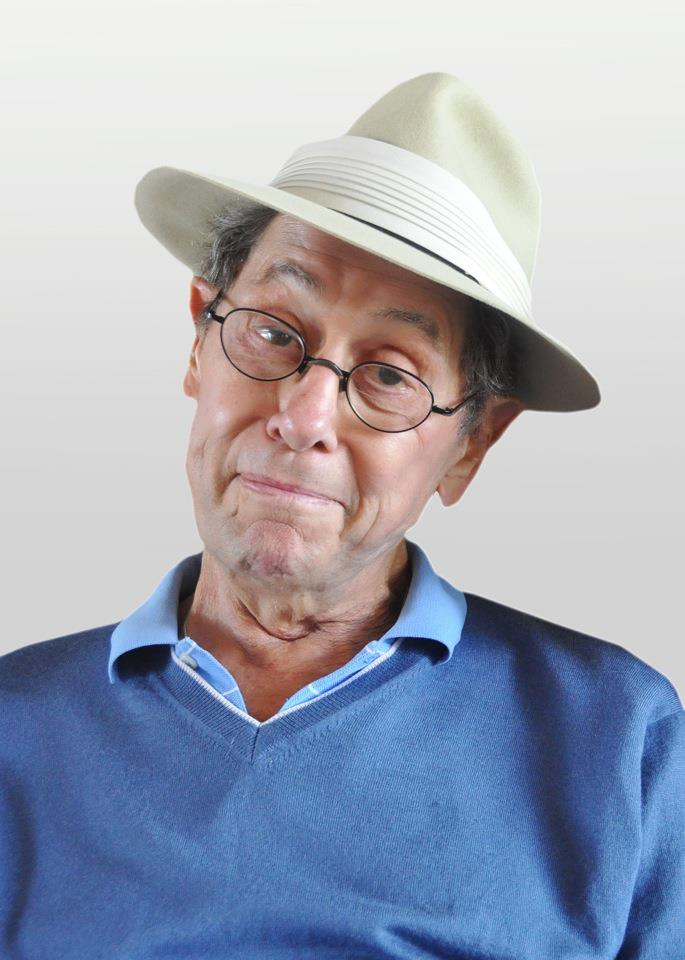
Murray Lender.

Murray Isaac Lender (October 29, 1930 – March 21, 2012) was an American businessman and entrepreneur who helped expand his father's small, Connecticut bagel bakery, Lender's Bagels, into a nationwide brand. Murray Lender served as the chief executive officer of Lender's, while his brother, Marvin, served as the company's president. Under Murray Lender, Lender's Bagels began selling frozen bagels to supermarkets in 1960, introducing many American consumers to the bagel for the first time. The Washington Post called Lender "the most important man in the modern history of bagels." Murray Lender also became known to the public for appearing in a series of television commercials for Lender's Bagels.

Murray Lender's father, Harry Lender, immigrated from Lublin, Poland, to the United States in 1927. That same year, Harry opened a small bagel bakery in New Haven, Connecticut, which catered to the city's Eastern European Jewish community. His wife, Rose Braiter Lender, and their three oldest children, Hyman,Sam and Anna followed Harry Lender to the United States in 1929.

Murray Lender was born in New Haven, Connecticut, on October 29, 1930. He graduated from Junior College of Commerce, which is now known as Quinnipiac University. Later, as chairman of Quinnipiac's Board of Trustees, he heard Quinnipiac President John L. Lahey give talks on the history of the Great Hunger in Ireland, and as a result donated funds to create the Ireland’s Great Hunger Museum at Quinnipiac. "A lot of Irish and Irish American artists and supporters helped to make this day possible, but without the support of a son of a Jewish immigrant from Poland who saw parallels in our experience we wouldn't be ...(able to).. dedicate this new facility. That's a proof of how important this story is to all immigrants," Lahey said.

Three brothers - Sam and Murray and Marvin - entered the family's bagel business, called H. Lender's and Sons. Harry Lender died in 1958 and the brothers began freezing bagels for sale in 1960. Murray also came up with the idea of pre-slicing bagels. Murray Lender and his family sold Lender's Bagels to Kraft Foods in 1984. The brand was acquired by the Pinnacle Foods Group in 2003.

Murray Lender died at a hospital in Miami, Florida, on March 21, 2012, at the age of 81. He had suffered injuries in a fall ten weeks earlier at his home in Aventura, Florida. He was survived by his children Carl Lender, Haris Lender and Jay Lender and 6 grandchildren.
