= Bagel machine =

Machine that automatically produces bagels

- Classification: Appliance
- Industry: Food & Beverages
- Application: Automatic bagel production
- Inventor: Daniel Thompson
- Invented: 1950

A bagel machine is a machine that automatically produces bagels. It rolls, presses, and shapes dough into perfect circles.

== History ==
In 1950, Daniel Thompson began designing an automatic bagel-making machine when he was 29. His father had been trying to make a working automatic bagel-making machine for most of his life to advance his baking business, and Thompson was following in his footsteps.

In 1958, Thompson started construction of the first successful automatic bagel-making machine in his garage in Cheviot Hills, Los Angeles. He called it “The Thompson Bagel Machine”. A few years later, he patented his design. One year later, in 1961, he and his wife established the "Thompson Bagel Machine Manufacturing Corporation". Five years after he started construction of the bagel machine, he leased the successful and perfected design to Murray Lender, who owned a family-run bagel-making business.

The first automated bagel-making machines were introduced to New Haven, Connecticut, Buffalo, New York, and St. Louis, Missouri in 1963, producing between 200 and 400 bagels per hour. The largest machines could produce as many as 5,000 bagels in an hour. Bagels had very quickly become extremely popular and were in abundance in supermarkets and restaurants because of Thompson’s bagel-making machine. The price of the bagel has dropped significantly because they are now being mass produced everywhere in the world.

== Impact ==
Before Thompson's automatic bagel-making machine was invented, making bagels was a slow process. Very few bakers actually made them. After the automatic bagel machine was invented, many more bagels were produced and the bagel became much more common. The automatic bagel-making machine popularized the bagel, leading to it being featured in many supermarkets and restaurants around the world.

== Use and features ==
The bagel machine automatically mass creates bagels by rolling the bagels, shaping the bagels, and pressing the bagels until they are a circular shape.
