= Judy D. Olian =

Australian-American academic administrator

9th President of Quinnipiac University
- In office July 1, 2018 – July 1, 2025
- Preceded by: John Lahey
- Succeeded by: Marie Hardin

Personal details
- Born: Australia
- Education: Hebrew University of Jerusalem (BS); University of Wisconsin–Madison (MS, PhD)

Judy D. Olian is an Australian-American academic administrator who served as the 9th president of Quinnipiac University in Hamden, Connecticut from 2018-2025.

== Early life and education ==
Olian was born and raised in Australia, the daughter of Holocaust survivors. During her childhood, Olian also lived in Israel. She received a Bachelor of Science degree from the Hebrew University of Jerusalem. She went on to receive a Masters of Science degree and PhD in industrial relations from the University of Wisconsin–Madison.

== Career ==
Olian was a professor of management & organization and served as senior associate dean of the Robert H. Smith School of Business at the University of Maryland. She worked as dean of the Smeal College of Business at Pennsylvania State University from 2001 to 2006, where she was a Professor of Management. She was the dean of the UCLA Anderson School of Management from 2006 to 2018, where she held the John E. Anderson Chair in Management. In 2008, she was the chair of the Association to Advance Collegiate Schools of Business.

Olian is a member of the board of directors of Ares Management, an investment firm based in Los Angeles, and the United Therapeutics Corporation. Additionally, she is a member of the board of advisors of several other companies, including Mattel and Catalyst, a non-profit organization which promotes an inclusive workplace for women. She is on the council of advisors of the United States Studies Centre at the University of Sydney. Olian is a recipient of an American Council on Education Fellowship and the Maryland Association for Higher Education Award for Innovation. On January 29, 2018, Olian was announced as the new president of Quinnipiac University, replacing John Lahey, effective July 1, 2018.

On August 23, 2024, Olian announced she would be stepping down as president after the conclusion of the 2024-2025 academic year.
