= Sam Forster =

Canadian American writer

- Born: December 17, 1996 (age 29); Edmonton, Alberta, Canada
- Education: University of Alberta , University of Toronto
- Occupations: writer, journalist, cultural critic, and war correspondent

Samuel Forster is a Canadian American journalist, and cultural critic whose 2024 book, Americosis, was awarded the Sutherland House Prize for non-fiction.

He is known in part for the controversy around his use of "journalistic” blackface while researching his 2024 book on race relations, Seven Shoulders. He has reported on the Russo-Ukrainian War and the Arab-Israeli conflict.

== Life and education ==
Forster has a Bachelor's of Arts from the University of Alberta and a master's degree from the University of Toronto.

While in Toronto, Forster was a graduate associate at the centre for ethics where he researched the application of neuroscientific evidence in criminal court proceedings.

== Career ==
Forster has contributed to various print and digital publications, including Canada's National Observer and City & State, primarily writing about culture and economic affairs.

In 2022, Forster worked for The Buenos Aires Times, an English-language newspaper owned by Perfil. During his time in Argentina, Forster focused on politics and foreign affairs, frequently interviewing diplomats such as Indonesian ambassador Niniek Kun Naryatie.

During the spring of 2023, Forster travelled throughout Ukraine, covering the Russo-Ukrainian War as a correspondent for The National Post and UnHerd.

In the aftermath of the 2023 Hamas-led attack on Israel, while reporting on pro-Palestine demonstrations in Montreal, Forster published video footage that became the centre of controversy in the Canadian media. The footage garnered response from Canadian Minister of Immigration Marc Miller as well as Alberta member of parliament Mike Lake.

In the winter of 2024, Forster travelled to Lebanon and Israel to report on the ongoing Arab-Israeli conflict for The Spectator.

=== Americosis ===
In January 2024, Forster released his first book, Americosis, which received the first Sutherland House non-fiction prize from its publisher.

The American Conservative praised Forster's vivid descriptions of the disorder of public transit. The American Spectator praised Forster's "cinema verité style for his subject" but criticized his analysis.

=== Seven Shoulders ===
Forster's second book, Seven Shoulders: Taxonomizing Racism in Modern America, generated significant backlash upon its May 2024 announcement due to Forster's use of blackface. The work chronicles Forster traveling across the United States in blackface in order to document modern forms of racism. Forster cited the work of prominent civil rights journalist and Martin Luther King Jr. ally John Howard Griffin, who wrote a similar book titled Black Like Me, as literary inspiration. Forster utilized foundation, a wig, and colored contacts. The book was self-published, and Forster described it as "the most important book on American race relations that has ever been written."

Many prominent Black writers and journalists questioned the need for Foster to investigate racism himself through the use of blackface rather than speaking to Black Americans. Responding to the book's release, Derrick Johnson, president of the NAACP, wrote, "Being able to pick and choose when you experience 'blackness' is not a reality for the millions of Black people we serve, who face racism and marginalization every day. Next time try investing time in centering authentic Black voices and experiences." Reviews criticized Forster's claim that institutional racism was "effectively dead" while interpersonal racism was still in effect.

=== Canadian Affairs ===
In August 2024, Canadian Affairs announced that Forster had joined the outlet as a staff reporter.

Forster is a member of Canada's Parliamentary Press Gallery, the nation's preeminent journalism organization.

In January 2025, Forster travelled to Latvia to report on Operation Reassurance, Canada's military mission to enhance NATO's troop presence on the Russian border.

In June 2025, Forster temporarily returned to his home province of Alberta in order to report from the 51st G7 Summit in Kananaskis.

In August 2025, Forster returned to Ukraine to report on Operation Unifier in Khmelnytskyi Oblast, later traveling to the Russian-occupied oblasts of Sumy and Donetsk. While in Donetsk, Forster visited the Alcatraz Battalion near the frontline city of Kramatorsk, where Reuters employee Ryan Evans was killed by a Russian air strike the previous summer.

In September 2025, U.S. Senator and former vice-presidential nominee Tim Kaine stated in an interview with Forster that he supports Canada's recognition of Palestine.
