= Baruch Frydman-Kohl =

Rabbi and Order of Canada Recipient

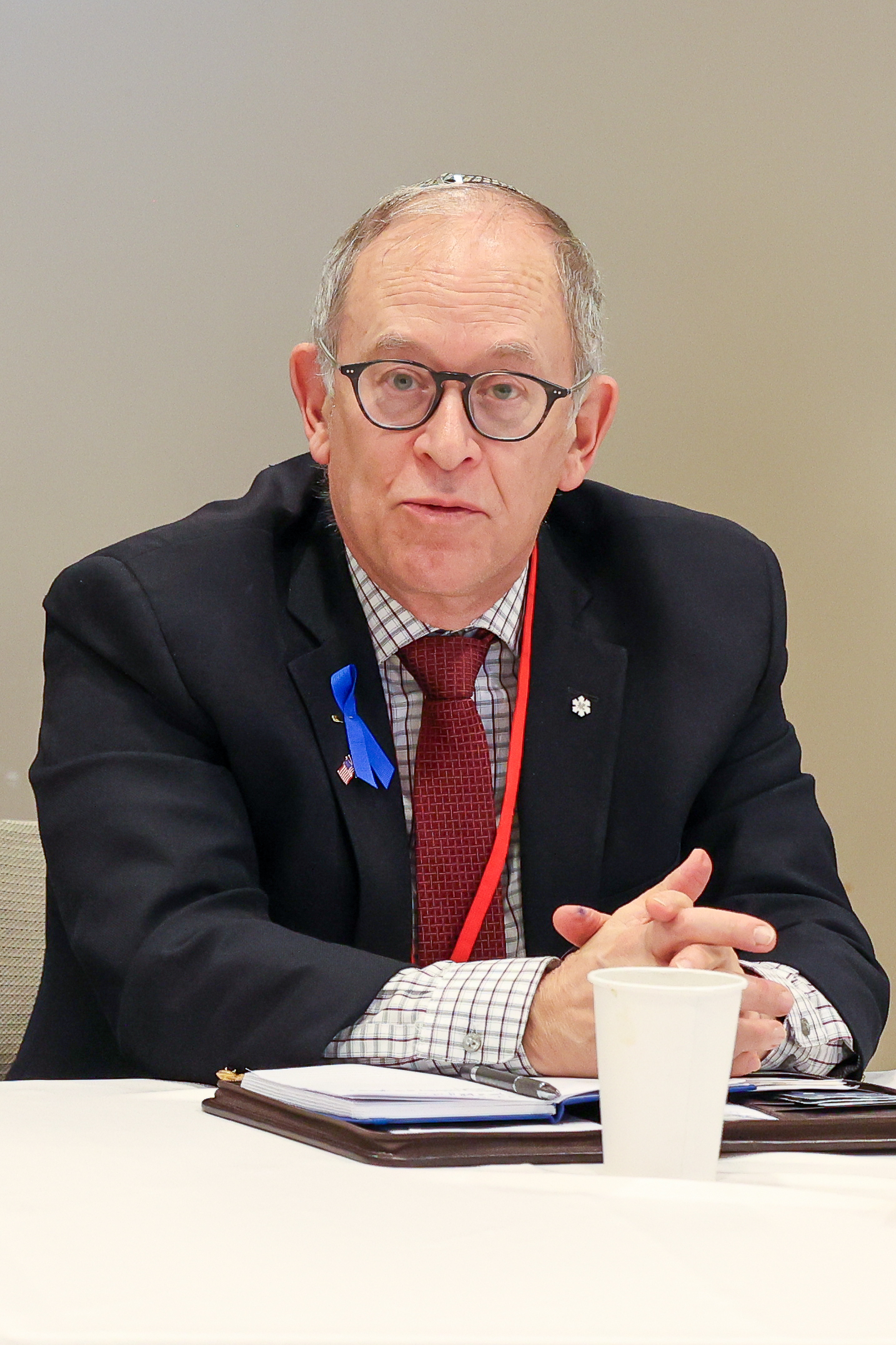
Frydman-Kohl in 2023

Baruch Frydman-Kohl (born Byron Cyril Kohl) is a Canadian-American who served as the Anne and Max Tanenbaum Senior Rabbi of Beth Tzedec Congregation, the largest Conservative synagogue community in North America, from 1993-2019. He is now Rabbi Emeritus. In 2022, he was appointed as a Member of the Order of Canada.

== Early life and academic training ==
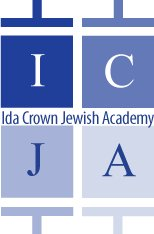
Logo of the Ida Crown Jewish Academy.

Frydman-Kohl was born in Milwaukee, Wisconsin on 7 February 1951. His parents were Jack Kohl and Rachel Horowitz. He was raised by his mother in Chicago, and graduated from the Ida Crown Jewish Academy in 1968.

Affected by the civil rights movement, he attended Northwestern University in a program funded by the Carnegie Foundation to train teachers for minority communities. Active against the Vietnam war, he organized buses to bring Jewish students to a major anti-war demonstration in Washington, DC in November 1969. Elected to the National Commission of Hillel Foundations, he was a leader of the Jewish Student Movement at Northwestern, helped survey the extent of poverty among elderly Chicago Jews, demonstrated for increased funding for Jewish education, and was involved in efforts to free Soviet Jews. During his rabbinical studies, he served as the leader of Makom, an experimental Jewish community in Chicago.

Frydman-Kohl attended the Jewish Theological Seminary where he was ordained as a rabbi in 1977. He received the degree of Doctor of Hebrew letters in Philosophies of Judaism from JTS in 2004. His thesis, about a 15th-century Spanish rabbinic commentator and polemicist, was "Faith, Fidelity and Flourishing in Hazut Qashah by Isaac Arama."

Frydman-Kohl was awarded the degree of Doctor of Divinity (honorary, 2003) from the Jewish Theological Seminary and was named Senior Rabbinic Fellow of the Shalom Hartman Institute of Jerusalem (2004). In 2018, he was awarded a Master of Law degree in Dispute Resolution by Osgoode Hall Law School of York University.

== Career ==
Frydman-Kohl served as Rabbi of Ohav Shalom Congregation in Albany, NY from 1977-1993, during which time the synagogue grew from 200 to 400 families, fostering living room learning, youth activities and family education. In Albany, Frydman-Kohl served as Chair of the Community Relations Committee of the Jewish Federation, President of the Capital District Board of Rabbis, and President of the Empire Region of the Rabbinical Assembly.

In 1988, Frydman-Kohl led a support mission of congregants to the former Soviet Union that received significant local media attention. He subsequently was involved with the successful resettlement of many former Soviet Jews in Albany. He was awarded a Coolidge Fellowship by the Association for Religion and Intellectual Life to pursue research in an interfaith community at the Episcopal Divinity School at Harvard University (1992).

Logo of the Jewish Federation of North America.

In 1993, Frydman-Kohl became the spiritual leader of Beth Tzedec Congregation in Toronto, Ontario. In that role, he developed programs in family education and life-long learning, directed attention to the hospitalized, home-bound and bereaved, and initiated the development of a "synaplex" of diverse ritual and educational opportunities to encourage more participation. During his years at Beth Tzedec, the congregation continued its multi-year effort to ransom Syrian Jews and bring them to the United States and Israel.

As the Anne and Max Tanenbaum Senior Rabbi, Frydman-Kohl mentored a generation of Israeli and Canadian rabbis through the Tanenbaum Fellowships and served on the Executive Committee of the Rabbinical Assembly, as President of its Ontario Region, and as a member of its Committee on Jewish Law and Standards.

Frydman-Kohl was deeply involved in work with the UJA Federation of Greater Toronto which honoured him with the Gordie Wolfe Award for Communal Professional Leadership in 2016. He was one of the initiators of Sukkahville, a design competition intended to use the temporary booths associated with the Jewish holiday of Sukkot as a way to highlight the need for affordable housing, and has been a leader in Out of the Cold, an initiative to provide food and shelter to the homeless of Toronto.

Logo of the Northwestern Kellogg School of Management.

He is currently Vice-Chair of the Canadian Rabbinic Caucus, a member of the Catholic-Jewish Consultation of Canada, and a member of the Advisory Committee of the Centre for Jewish Studies of the University of Toronto. He previously served on the Advisory Board of the Jewish Leadership program at Northwestern University's Kellogg School of Management.

Frydman-Kohl initiated and co-led several multi-faith Path of Abraham missions to the Holy Land and serves as faculty for the interfaith educational program, Sharing Perspectives, sponsored by St George's College in Jerusalem, and helped to organize interfaith building for Habitat for Humanity. He was honoured by the North Toronto Interfaith Group (2010), and by the Canadian Council of Imams (2017). The Rabbi was one of the initiators of the multi-faith Memorial and Solidarity Vigil for the victims of the Yonge Street vehicle violence and helped develop Rings of Peace around Muslim and Catholic places of worship in response to terrorist attacks.

In addition to scholarly articles in the areas of Jewish thought, Frydman-Kohl has written for the Canadian Jewish News, Macleans magazine, The National Post, Times of Israel, and Albany Jewish World. He has been interviewed on CBC radio and was featured in two documentaries. In 2012, he delivered the opening prayer in the United States Senate, prior to the retirement of his cousin, Herbert Kohl, as senator from Wisconsin.

== Personal life ==
Frydman-Kohl married Josette Frydman in 1970. They have three sons: Yakov (married to Sarah), Rafi, and Amir (married to Amanda), with grandchildren in Toronto and Jerusalem.

== Publications ==
- "Review Essay: When Bad Things Happen to Good People," Conservative Judaism 36/4 (1984), 90-101.
- "Covenant, Conversion and Chosenness: Maimonides and Halevi on 'Who is a Jew?'," Judaism 41/1 (1992), 64-79.
- Pacto, conversión y elección," Maj' Shavot/ Pensamientos, Año XXXII - N°14. Enero-Diciembre 1993- Tevet-Kislev
- "Isaac Arama," Reader's Guide to Judaism, ed. Michael Terry. Fitzroy Dearborn Publishers (Chicago, 2000), 36.
- "Biblical Priesthood," Reader's Guide to Judaism, ed. Michael Terry. Fitzroy Dearborn Publishers (Chicago, 2000), 36.
- "In Pursuit of History and Holiness," Art and Tradition: Treasures of Jewish Life, ed. Dorion Liebgott. Beth Tzedec Reuben and Helene Dennis Museum (Toronto, 2000).
- "Abraham Joshua Heschel: Crossover Artist," think 9 (Spring-Summer 2011), 20-22.
- Featured in Exploring World Religions: The Canadian Perspective, Deo Kerhahan, et al. Oxford University Press, 2001.
- "Priests and Levites in the Bible and Jewish Life," Etz Hayim Commentary. Rabbinical Assembly (New York, 2001), 1441-1445
- "May the Words of Torah Be Sweet: The Transmission of a Faith Tradition," Ecumenism 148 (December 2002), 30-33.
- "Isaac Arama," Cambridge Dictionary of Judaism and Jewish Culture, ed. Judith Baskin. Cambridge University Press (New York, 2011), 23.
- "Dina d'Malkhuta Dina," Cambridge Dictionary of Judaism and Jewish Culture, ed. Judith Baskin. Cambridge University Press (New York, 2011), 135.
- "Gersonides," Cambridge Dictionary of Judaism and Jewish Culture, ed. Judith Baskin. Cambridge University Press (New York, 2011), 201.
- "Judah Halevi," Cambridge Dictionary of Judaism and Jewish Culture, ed. Judith Baskin. Cambridge University Press (New York, 2011), 213.
- "Medieval Thought," Cambridge Dictionary of Judaism and Jewish Culture, ed. Judith Baskin. Cambridge University Press (New York, 2011), 604-607.
- "From Disputation to Dialogue, Conflict to Cooperation," to Canadian Council of Catholic Bishops. Ottawa, 25 November 2015 ~ 14 Kislev 5776
- "After Saturday, Sunday: Endangered Christians in the Middle East," to conference convened by the Canadian Ambassador for Religious Freedom. Toronto, 7 December 2015.
- "Byron L. Sherwin: 'The Voice Still Speaks'", Journal of Jewish Ethics 2.1 (2016).
- "'Let the Power of the Eternal Be Great': Kaddish, Cosmos, and Covenant," in Kaddish, ed. David Birnbaum and Martin S. Cohen. Masorah Matrix (NY, 2016).
- "Shabbat as Sign and Signifier," in Veshamru, ed. David Birnbaum and Martin S. Cohen. Masorah Matrix (NY, 2019).
- Canadian Jewish News, op-ed and regular Torah column.
- Articles for the Canadian Jewish News
- Times of Israel Blog
