= Jacques Ruffié =

French haematologist, geneticist, and anthropologist

Jacques Ruffié (22 November 1921, Limoux, France – 1 July 2004) was a French haematologist, geneticist, and anthropologist. He founded a discipline, called blood typing, which allowed the study of blood characteristics to find the history of the people, their migration and their successive interbreeding. He was a colleague and great personal friend of Michel Foucault at the College de France; Foucault mentions him in a newly discovered essay review of a book that Ruffié published in 1976, entitled De la biologie à la culture (From Biology To Culture).

== Contributions and works ==
Ruffié studied at St. Stanislaus College of Carcassonne, and obtained medical degrees from medical schools in Toulouse, Montpellier and Paris and Toulouse Sciences Faculty. Doctor of Medicine, PhD, Associate Professor of the University. Professor of Hematology chair at the Toulouse Faculty of Medicine from 1965 to 1972. Director General of the Regional Blood Transfusion Centre in the region Midi-Pyrénées. Professor of physical anthropology at the Collège de France in 1972, based in Toulouse on blood typing center of the CNRS, he led in parallel. Research Professor at the University of New York. Member of the National Academy of Medicine. He deepened his study of life from three main disciplines: hematology, genetics, and anthropology. He created in 1960 the blood typing, which allows to find an individual by his blood characteristics and is a major contribution to modern forensic science that later spread and led to DNA testing. This technique also later allowed for the studies of kinship of human populations, as well as the movement of people.

He wrote several books on the subject of biologizing thesis, like "From biology to culture" or "Sex and death".

It went against the established ideas of his time establishing this method of what was considered as tracing two facts in anthropology:

According to Ruffié the concept of race had a meaning in primitive humanity. Also, the concept Convergence was well established in humans for about six thousand years, probably related to the development of long-distance trading. This long-term influence of cultural biology had later influenced Stephen Jay Gould, who he mentions in his public works (The Panda's Thumb: More Reflections in Natural History). It illustrates a co-development of humanization a humanization mentioned by Pierre Teilhard de Chardin.

He was a member of the Academy of Science in Human Biology Section and medical sciences. He was also an honorary professor at the Collège de France, where he occupied the chair of Physical anthropology .

He was also a member of the French Resistance during World War II.

He was a member of the Board of Royaumont Center for Science of Man.

== Awards ==
- Holder of the Military Medal
- Grand Officer of the Legion of Honour

== Works ==
- Culture to biology
- The living of the Treaty
- Sex and death (in collaboration with Jean Charles Sournia )
- The living and the human
- Epidemics in human history
- Geographic Hematology (in collaboration with Jean Bernard).
