= John L. Lahey =

American academic administrator

John Lahey

8th President of Quinnipiac University
- In office 1987–2018
- Succeeded by: Judy D. Olian

Personal details
- Born: 1946 (age 79–80) The Bronx, New York, U.S.
- Education: University of Dayton (BA, MA); Columbia University (M.Ed); University of Miami (PhD)

John L. Lahey (born 1946) is an American academic administrator who served as the 8th President of Quinnipiac University from 1987 to 2018.

== Early life and education ==
Lahey was born and raised in the Riverdale section of The Bronx, where he graduated from Fordham Preparatory School in 1964. bachelor's and master's degrees in Philosophy from the University of Dayton and a second master's degree in Higher Education Administration from Columbia University. He then earned his Ph.D. in Philosophy from the University of Miami in 1973.

== Career ==
Lahey was executive vice president of Marist College, where he served as chief operating officer. He became Quinnipiac’s president in 1987. Upon his arrival, Lahey initiated a strategic planning process, leading to the University’s unprecedented growth over the past two decades in enrollment, academic programs, reputation and physical plant.

Lahey is a director of the United Illuminating Company, the Aristotle Corporation, the Yale New Haven Hospital, and the Alliance for Gene Cancer Therapy.

He is a member of the Council of the American Bar Association Section of Legal Education and Admissions to the Bar. As vice-chairman of the New York City St. Patrick’s Day Parade Committee, he has devoted much of his time to educating the public about the historic implications of Ireland’s Great Hunger. In 1997, Lahey served as Grand Marshal of the Saint Patrick's Day Parade in New York City. In 2011, Lahey was named Irish American of the Year by Irish America magazine.

Lahey announced his retirement at the end of the 2017–2018 fiscal year at Quinnipiac University. At the time of his retirement, he had served Quinnipiac as president for 31 years and 3 months, watching the student body grow from 1,902 students to roughly 10,000. He was succeeded on July 1, 2018 by Judy Olian.
