= Daniel Thompson (inventor) =

Canadian-born American inventor (1921–2015)

- Born: Abraham Thomas Thompson; January 16, 1921; Winnipeg, Manitoba, Canada
- Died: September 3, 2015 (aged 94); Palm Desert, California, U.S.
- Occupations: Inventor, entrepreneur
- Spouse: Ada Schatz (m. 1946–2015)
- Children: Three

Daniel Thompson (January 16, 1921 – September 3, 2015) was a Canadian-born American inventor and entrepreneur. Thompson was best known as the inventor of the first commercially viable bagel machine, which allowed for the mass production and mass marketing of the bagel to a wider consumer market.

== Early years ==
Daniel Thompson was born Abraham Thomas Thompson on January 16, 1921, in Winnipeg, Manitoba, Canada. Within weeks of his birth, his parents changed his name to Daniel to honor a recently deceased cousin. While Thompson was still a child, his family moved to Los Angeles, and his father set up a bakery in Boyle Heights.

After graduating Fairfax High School, Thompson joined the United States Army Air Forces and served in the Pacific Ocean theater of World War II. He then returned home to attend the University of California and study Industrial Arts and Mathematics. After graduating, he became a teacher, working on his own inventions in his spare time. In 1953, his "Folding Table, Tennis Table, or the Like" was given a U.S. patent, and is the basis of all modern folding ping pong tables.

== Bagel business ==
The bagel had been largely a Jewish specialty food item prior to Thompson's invention of the "Thompson Bagel Machine," which he began building in his garage in Cheviot Hills, Los Angeles, in 1958. This popularized bagels and made them available to a wider consumer base.

== Personal life ==
In 1946, Thompson married Ada Schatz. They had three children. Thompson died in Palm Desert, California, of complications from a fall on September 3, 2015, at the age of 94.
