= List of poppy seed pastries and dishes =

This is a list of poppy seed pastries and dishes. Poppy seed is an oilseed obtained from the opium poppy (Papaver somniferum). The tiny kidney-shaped seeds have been harvested from dried seed pods by various civilizations for thousands of years. The seeds are used, whole or ground, as an ingredient in many foods, and they are pressed to yield poppyseed oil. Poppy seeds are less than a millimeter in length, and minute: it takes 3,300 poppy seeds to make up a gram, and a pound contains between 1 and 2 million seeds. The primary flavor compound is 2-pentylfuran.

== Poppy seed pastries and dishes ==
Name	Image	Origin	Description
Anarsa		Maharashtra, India	Flat fried snack of rice flour made with jaggery, ghee and poppy seeds.
Babka		Eastern Europe	
Baranka		Belarus	
Bein mont		Burma	Pancake made with a rice flour batter, garnished with grated coconut, peanuts, sesame seeds, and poppy seeds.
Bialy		Białystok, Poland	
Bublik		Ukraine	A traditional Ukrainian, Russian, Belarusian and Lithuanian (riestainis) bread roll. By far the most popular variety of bublik has a liberal amount of poppy seeds added to it.
Cebularz		Lublin, Poland	
Chatti pathiri		Kerala, India	
Esterházy torte		Hungary	
Flódni		Hungary	
Germknödel		Germany and Austria	A fluffy yeast dough dumpling with a mix of poppy seeds and sugar, filled with spicy plum jam and melted butter on top, often eaten with vanilla cream sauce. It is a culinary speciality of Austria, Bavaria, and Bohemia. The dish is served both as a dessert and as a main course.
Hamantashen			A triangular cookie filled with fruit preserves or honey and black poppy seed paste, eaten during the Jewish holiday of Purim. Hamantashen are made with many different fillings, including poppy seed (the oldest and most traditional variety), prunes, nut, date, apricot, apple, fruit preserves, cherry, chocolate, dulce de leche, halva, or even caramel or cheese. Their formation varies from hard pastry to soft doughy casings.
Haşhaşlı çörek		Turkey	
Kaiser roll		Austria	
Kalach			A traditional East Slavic bread, commonly served during various ritual meals. The name originates from the Old Slavonic word kolo (коло) meaning "circle", "wheel".
Kifli		Austria	
Kluski z makiem		Poland	Polish noodles with poppy seeds. Polish Christmas dishes may include poppy seeds because they are thought to help with sleeping peacefully.
Kolach			A type of pastry that holds a dollop of fruit rimmed by a puffy pillow of supple dough. Originating as a semisweet wedding dessert from Central Europe, they have become popular in parts of the United States. The word kolache (колаче) itself means 'a small cookie' in Macedonian. It is also known as kolache and kolachy.
Kołacz		Poland	A traditional pastry in Polish cuisine, originally a wedding cake that has made its way into American homes around the Christmas and Easter holidays. The pastry is a light and flaky dough filled with a variety of sweet and savory fillings such as apricot, raspberry, prune, sweet cheese, poppy seed or even a nut mixture.
Kūčiukai		Lithuania	
Kutia		Ukraine	A sweet grain and poppy seed pudding from Ukraine.
Lemon poppyseed muffins or cake		United States	These are popular in the U.S.
Međimurska gibanica		Croatia	
Mákos bejgli		Hungary	Hungarian poppyseed roll, also known as "Christmas bread"
Mákos guba		Hungary	A Hungarian bread pudding dessert made from crescent rolls, poppy seeds, and milk
Mákos metélt		Hungary	A dessert in Hungarian cuisine made with noodles, poppy seeds and sugar.
Makovník	(photo link)	Slovakia	A nut roll filled with poppy seed paste.
Makowiec		Poland	
Makovnjača		Croatia	A Croatian poppy seed cake or roll.
Makový závin		Czech Republic	Czech poppy seed roll.
Makówki			A traditional poppy seed-based dessert from Central Europe. It is most notable in Silesia, where it is served almost exclusively on Christmas Eve (and perhaps on the following days, as long as the supply prepared for Christmas lasts).
Makiełki			
Mohnbeugel			A sweet filled pastry with poppy seeds.
Mohnnudel		Bohemia and Austria	
Mohnpielen			
Mohnschnecken		Germany and Austria	A sweet roll with poppyseed filling.
Mohnstriezel		Austria	Austrian poppyseed cake.
Mohnstrudel		Austria	Poppyseed strudel popular in Germany and Austria.
Mohnzelten			
Nunt			
Obwarzanek krakowski		Kraków, Poland	A ring-shaped bread product made of strands of dough twisted into a spiral that is boiled and sprinkled with salt, poppy seeds, sesame seeds, etc., before being baked.
Pogača		Balkans	
Poppy seed bagel			Bagels with poppy seeds, often on top. Poppy seeds are sometimes called by their Yiddish name, spelled either mun or mon (written מאָן) which is very similar to the German word for poppy, Mohn, as used in Mohnbrötchen.
Poppy seed roll			A pastry consisting of a roll of sweet yeast bread (a viennoiserie) with a dense, rich, bittersweet filling of poppy seed. An alternative filling is a paste of minced walnuts, making it a walnut roll. The dough is made of flour, sugar, egg yolk, milk or sour cream and butter, and yeast. The dough may be flavored with lemon or orange zest or rum. The poppy seed filling may contain ground poppy seeds, raisins, butter or milk, sugar or honey, rum and vanilla. It is popular in parts of Central Europe, Eastern Europe and in Israel. It is commonly eaten at Christmas and Easter time. It is traditional in several cuisines, including the Hungarian cuisine (mákos bejgli), Russian cuisine (bulochki s makom Russian: булочки с маком), Serbian cuisine (маковњача), Bosnian cuisine (makovnjača), Polish cuisine (makowiec), Czech cuisine (makový závin), Slovak cuisine (makovník), Lithuanian cuisine (aguonų vyniotinis), Croatian cuisine (makovnjača), Romanian cuisine (ruladă cu mac or ruladă cu nuci), and Austrian cuisine (Mohnkuchen or Mohnstriezel Danish cuisine: [ˈʋiːˀnɔˌbʁœːˀð]).
Potica		Slovenia	
Prekmurska gibanica		Slovenia	A cake made with poppy seeds, cottage cheese, walnuts, and apples from Slovenia
Rice puddings (various) (esp. with black poppy seeds)			Such as "Mohnpielen", a Silesian chilled bread and poppy seed pudding, and a Senegalese-influenced lime-scented poppy-seed rice pudding by Marcus Samuelsson
Rugelach		Poland	
St. Martin's croissant		Poznań, Poland	
Sanwin makin		Burma	
Shulyky		Ukraine	
Simbo posto		Odisha, India	
Šimtalapis		Lithuania	A Lithuanian poppy seed roll.
Štrudla s makom		Serbia and Montenegro	A Serbian and Montenegrin poppy seed strudel, cake or roll.
Sushki		Russia	Traditional Russian and Ukrainian tea breads. Similarly to the bubliki, they are often topped with poppy seeds. Usually, poppy seeds are also added to the dough.
Tebirkes		Denmark	
Xacuti		Goa, India	
Колач со афион		Republic of Macedonia	Poppy seed cake.

== See also ==
- List of pastries
- List of desserts
- List of sesame seed dishes
