= Smarhon =

Town in Grodno Region, Belarus

Smarhon Смаргонь (Belarusian)
- Town
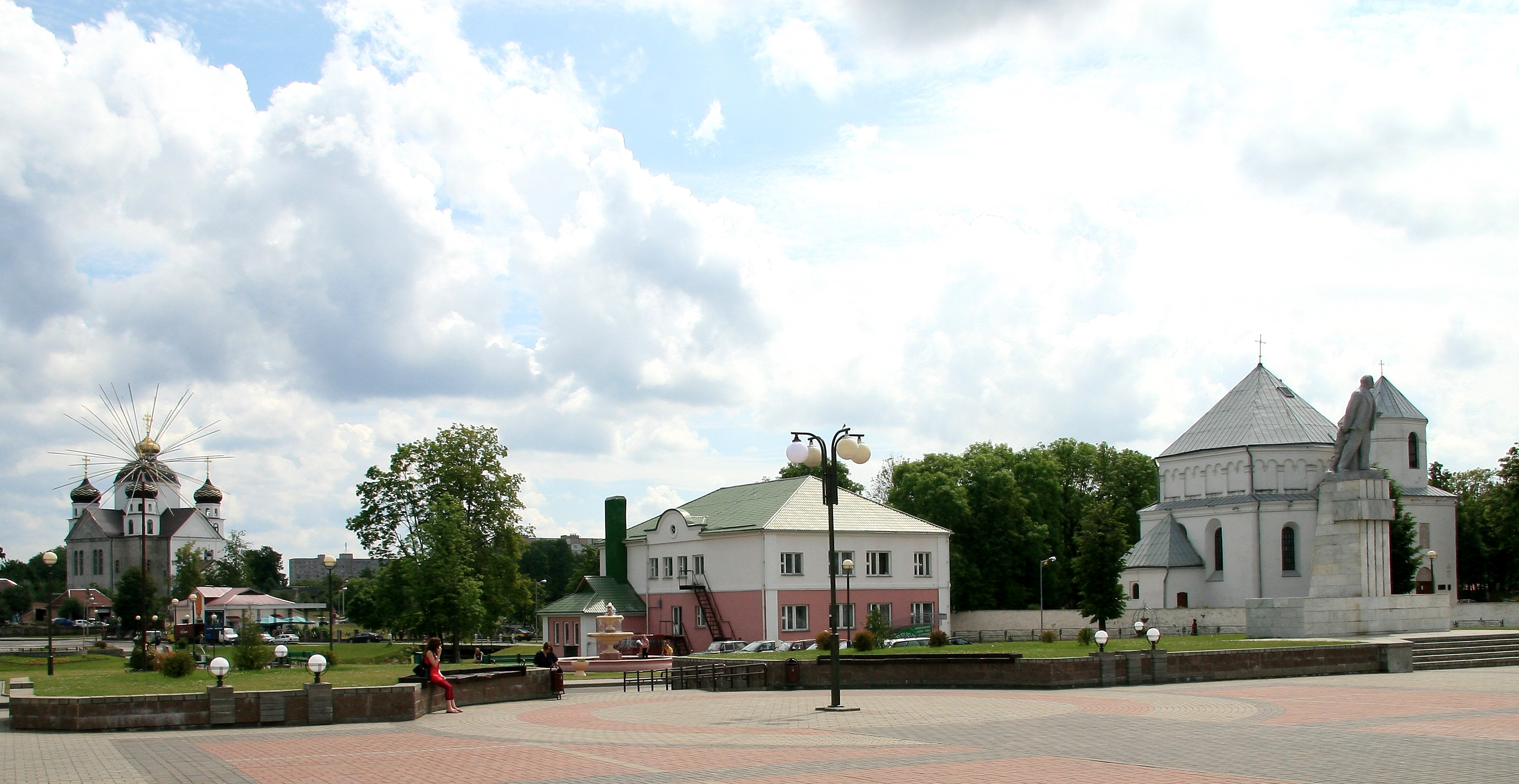
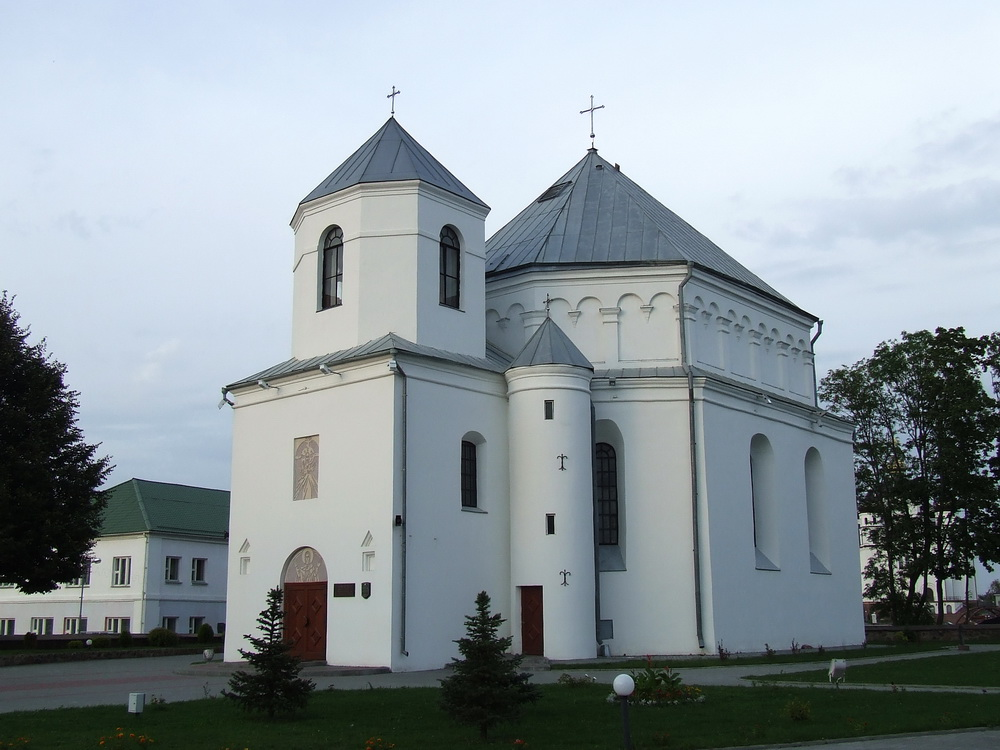
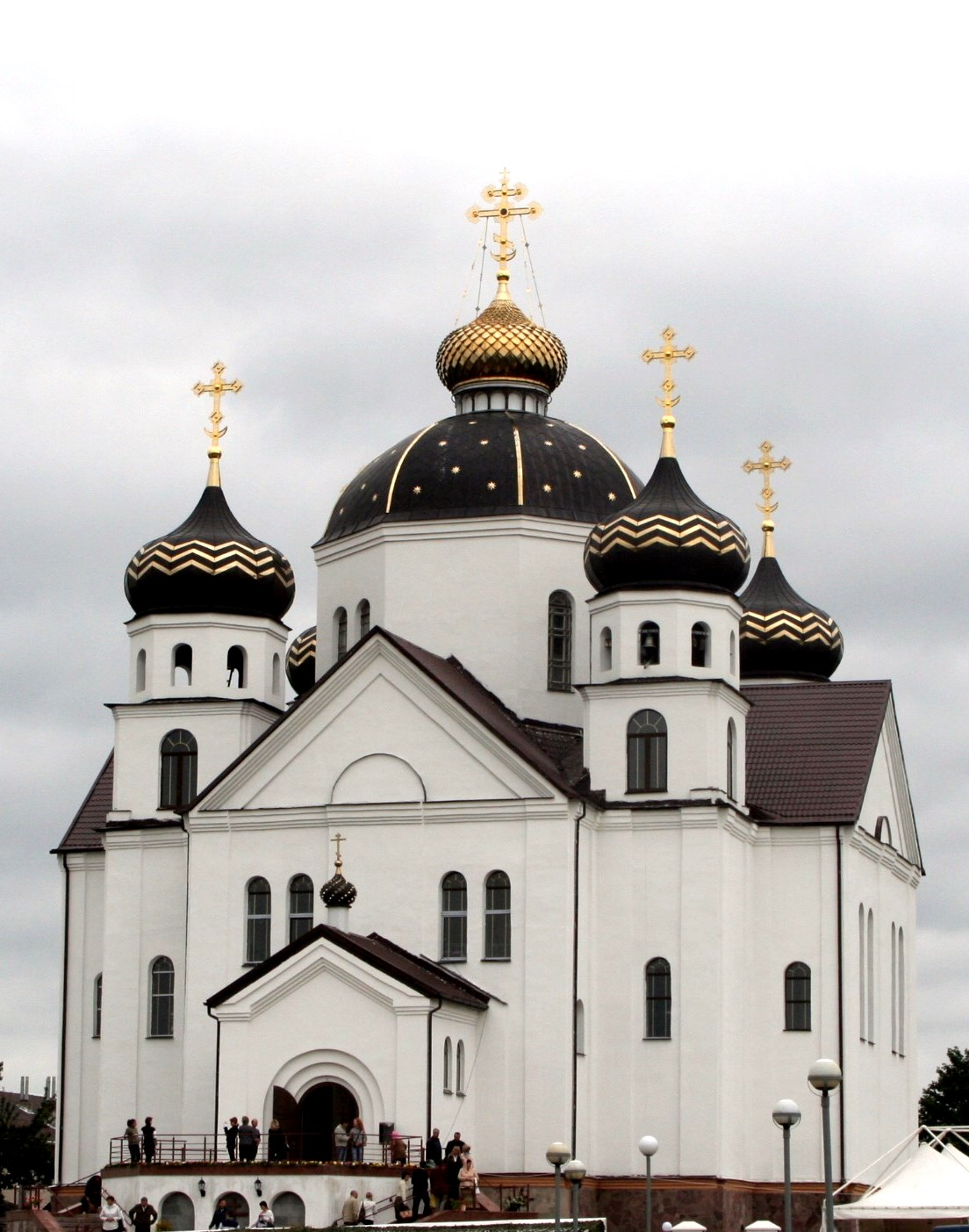
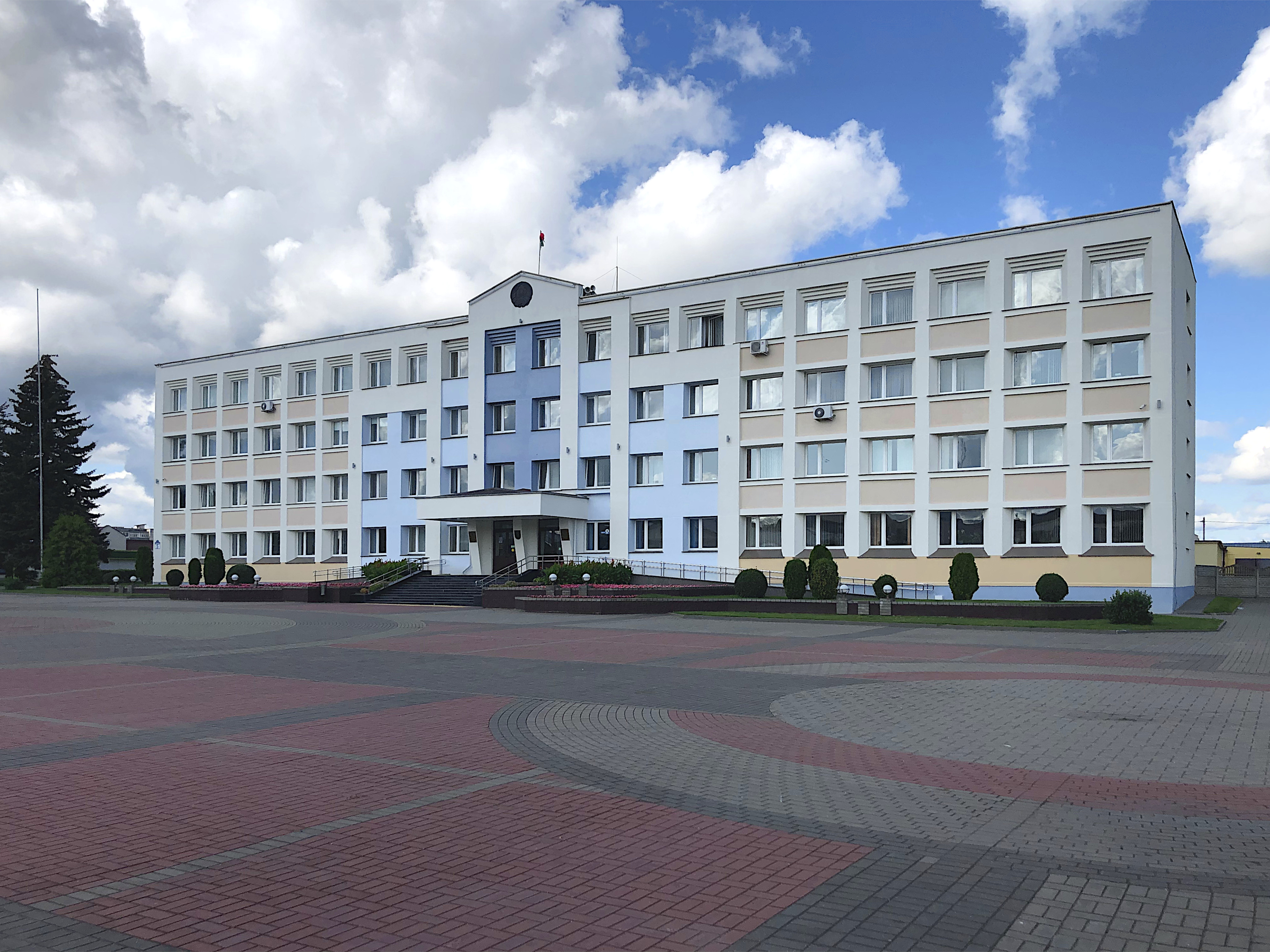
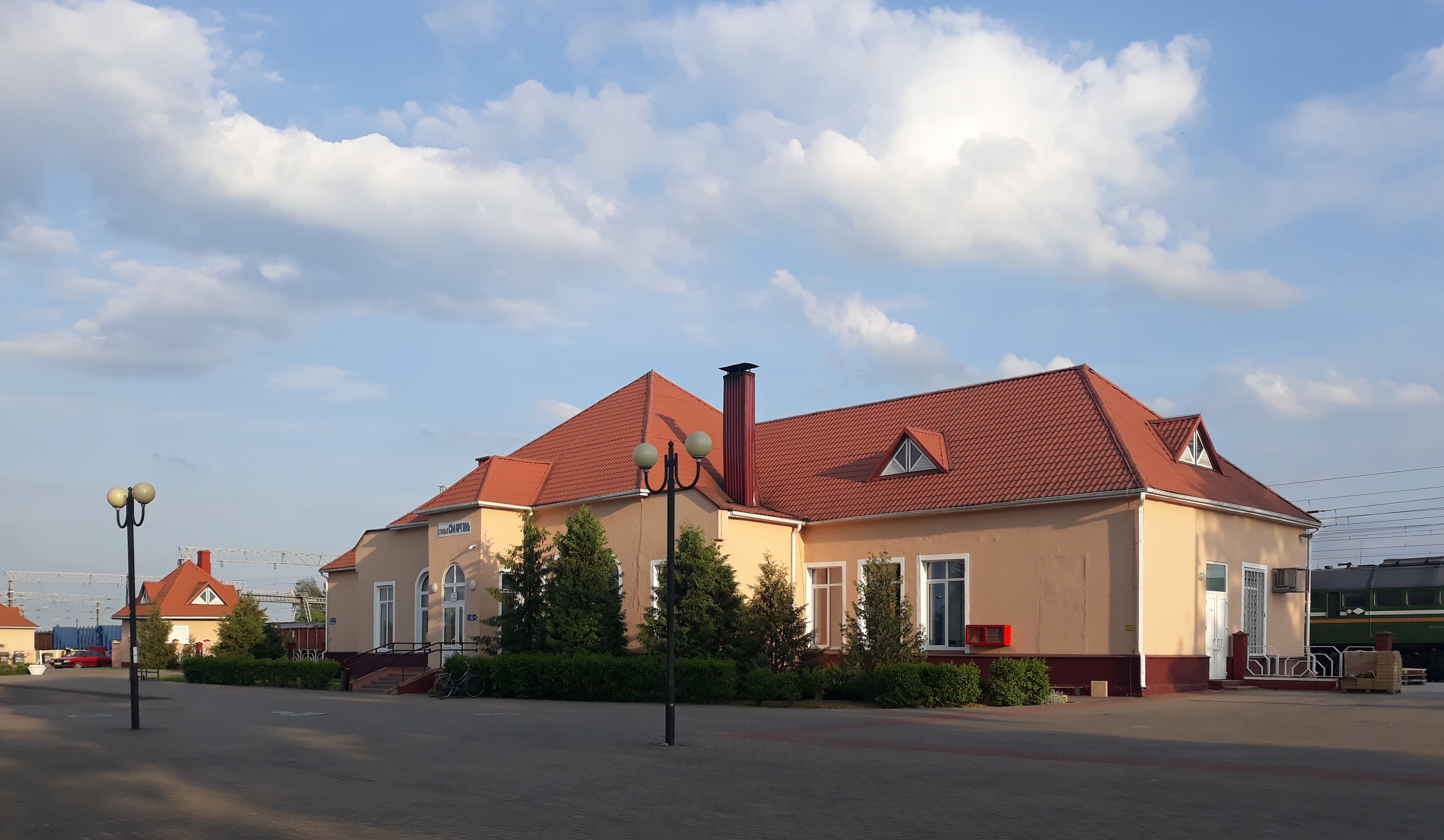
- Central square of the town with churches in the background and the statue of Vladimir Lenin Church of Saint Michael the Archangel Orthodox Church of the Transfiguration of Jesus Christ Administration building Train station

- Flag Coat of arms

- Location within Belarus
- Coordinates: 54°29′1″N 26°24′0″E
- Country: Belarus
- Region: Grodno Region
- District: Smarhon District
- Founded: October 2, 1503

Area
  - Total: 19.15 km^{2} (7.39 sq mi)
- Elevation: 150 m (490 ft)

Population (2025)
  - Total: 35,072
- Time zone: UTC+3 (MSK)
- Postal code: 231000, 231041-231045
- Area code: +375 1592
- License plate: 4
- Website: Official website

Smarhon, (Note: Belarusian: Смаргонь [smɐrˈɣonʲ].) or Smorgon, (Note: Russian: Сморгонь; Lithuanian: Smurgainys; Polish: Smorgonie; Yiddish: סמאָרגאָן.) is a town in Grodno Region, Belarus. It serves as the administrative center of Smarhon District. It was the site of Smarhon air base, which is now mostly abandoned. Smarhon is located 107 kilometres (66 mi) from the capital, Minsk and as of 2025, it has a population of 35,072.

== History ==
Within the Grand Duchy of Lithuania, Smarhon was part of Vilnius Voivodeship. Forty percent of the names of Smarhon District's settlements have remained of Lithuanian origin, while residents of Smarhon once spoke in the Eastern Aukštaitian-Vilnian dialect of Lithuanian language. It was a private town of the Zenowicz, Radziwiłł and Przezdziecki noble families until 1830. During the Great Northern War, Kings Charles XII of Sweden and Stanisław Leszczyński of Poland met in the town in 1708, before Stanisław departed for Malbork.

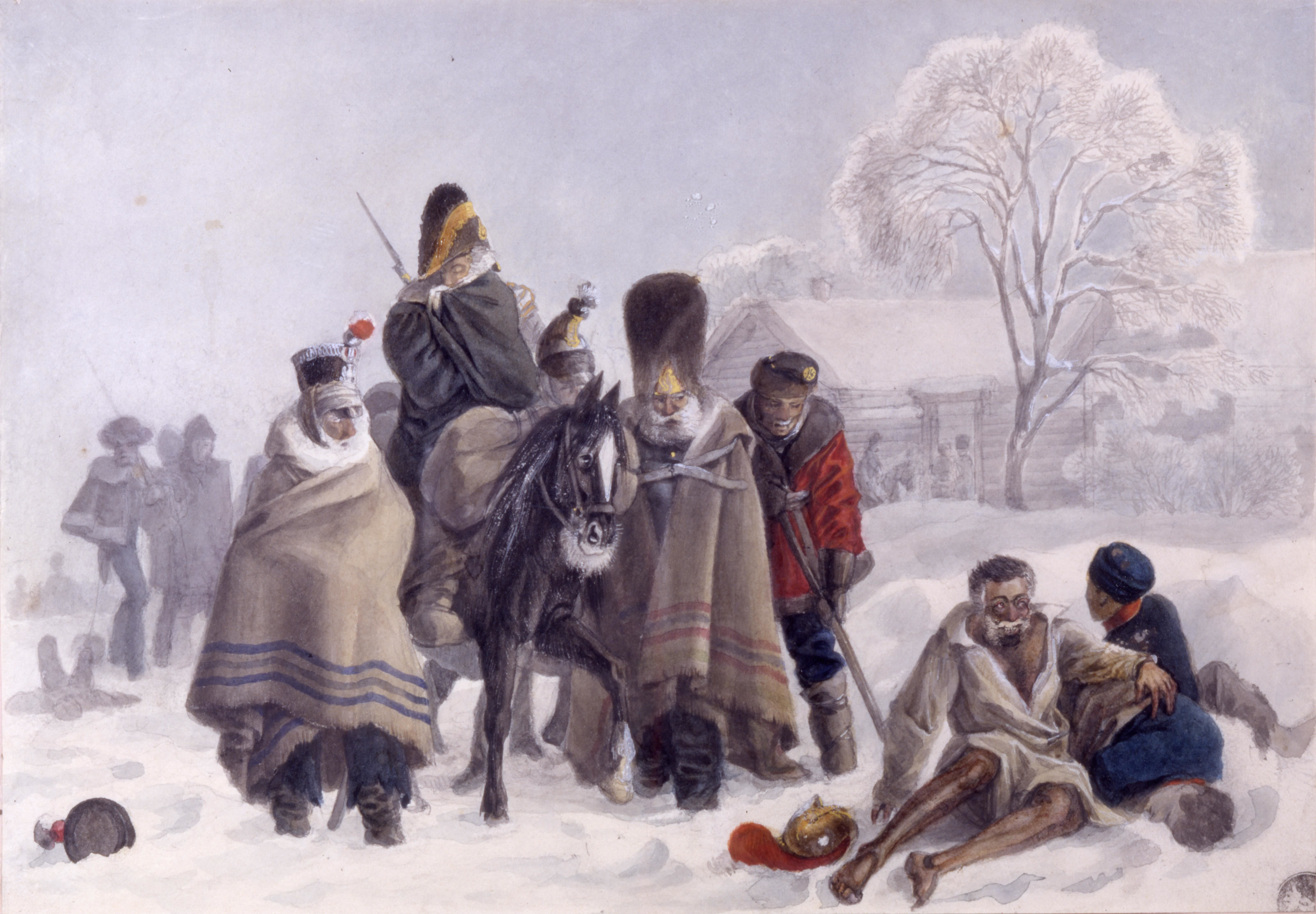
Remnant of the Grande Armée passing through the town

In 1795, the town was acquired by the Russian Empire in the course of the Third Partition of Poland. Amid the disastrous retreat from Russia in 1812, Napoleon left the remnants of the Grande Armée at Smorgon on December 5 to return to Paris. The town suffered a fire in 1880. From 1921 until 1939, Smarhon (Smorgonie) was part of the Second Polish Republic.

During World War II, in September 1939, the town was occupied by the Red Army and, on 14 November 1939, incorporated into the Byelorussian SSR. From 25 June 1941 until 4 July 1944, Smarhon was occupied by Nazi Germany and administered as a part of the Generalbezirk Litauen of Reichskommissariat Ostland.

Smorgon is known as the place where a school of bear training, the so-called "Bear Academy", was founded.

== Culture ==
Up until World War II, Smarhon was widely known for its baranki, traditional Eastern European ring-shaped bread rolls, similar to bagels and bubliki. Russian food historian William Pokhlyobkin considered Smarhon to be the birthplace of baranki. Baranki were supposedly used to feed bears in the Bear Academy. Written accounts of Smarhon baranki appeared in the 19th century. Polish-Lithuanian journalist Adam Kirkor wrote in the encyclopedia Picturesque Russia: "In Smorgon, Oshmyany district, Vilna province, almost all the petty bourgeois population is busy baking small bubliki, or kringles, which are widely known as Smorgon obvaranki. Each traveller would definitely buy several bundles of these bubliki; besides, they are transported to Vilna and other cities." Władysław Syrokomla mentioned Smarhon as "the capital of obwarzanki famous in all Lithuania". Smarhon obwarzanki were a traditional treat at Saint Casimir's Fair in Vilnius.

== International relations ==
Smarhon is twinned with:

- Visaginas, Lithuania
- Alytus, Lithuania
- Krasnoznamensk, Russia

== Notable people ==
- Peter Blume (1906–1992), US painter, in magic realism style
- Isaac Itkind (1871–1969), distinguished Russian and Soviet sculptor
- Abraham Isaac Kook (1865–1935), rabbi, Jewish theologist, Ashkenazi chief rabbi of Palestine, learned in Smarhon Yeshiva
- Moyshe Kulbak (1896–1937), Belarusian Yiddish poet, writer, executed by the NKVD
- Moshe Koussevitzky (1899–1966), Polish-US Jewish cantor
- Ida Lazarovich Gilman or Ida Mett (1901–1973), Russian anarchist militant and author, exiled in France
- Shalom Levin (1916–1995), Secretary Gen. and President of Israel Teachers Union, Knesset (Parliament) Member, educator and author
- Shmuel Rodensky (1902–1989), Israeli actor
- Karol Dominik Przezdziecki (1782–1832), Polish count, fighter for the liberation of Poland in the revolt of 1830–1831
- David Raziel (1910–1941), fighter for the emancipation of Jews in Palestine, commander of the Irgun Tzvai Leumi nationalist resistance organization, killed in Iraq on an anti-Nazi mission
- Esther Raziel Naor (1911–2002), Israeli politician, militant in the Irgun Jewish nationalist resistance during the British mandate in Palestine
- William Schwartz (1896–1977), US painter
- Nahum Slouschz (1872–1966), Israeli writer, translator and archaeologist
- Abraham Sutzkever (1913–2010), Yiddish and Polish poet and Second World War partisan
- The Gordin brothers, Abba (1887–1964) and Wolf (1885–1974), anarchist educators, militants, and theorists
