= Sushki =

Small, crunchy, mildly sweet bread rings

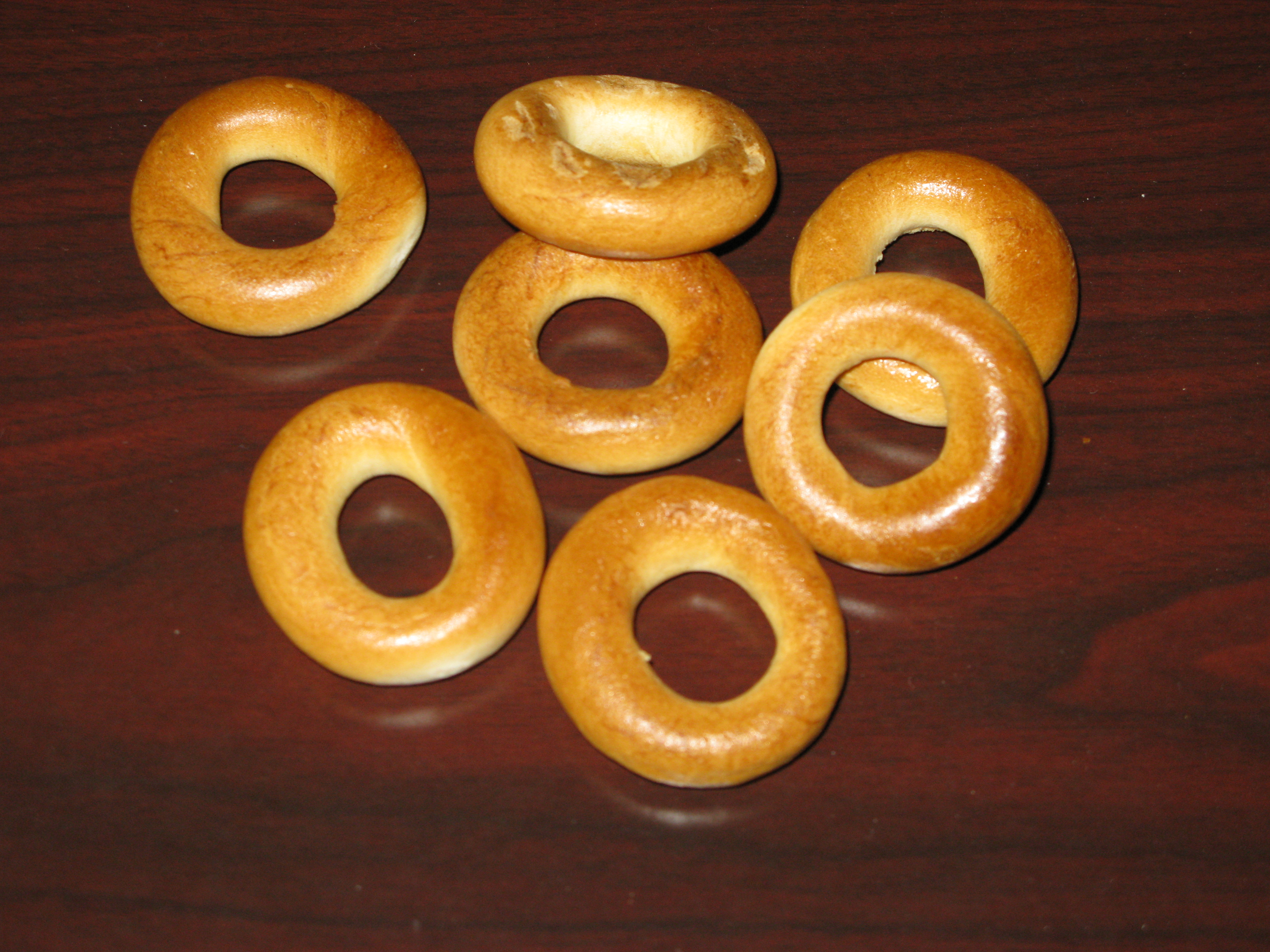
- Type: Sweet bread
- Associated cuisine: Belarusian, Lithuanian, Polish, Russian, Ukrainian,
- Main ingredients: Flour, eggs, sugar

Sushki (sg. sushka; Russian: су́шки, IPA: [ˈsuʂkʲɪ], plural; Russian: су́шка, IPA: [ˈsuʂkɐ], singular) are traditional Eastern European small, crunchy, mildly sweet bread rings eaten for dessert, usually with tea or coffee.

The word sushka has a common root with the Russian verb sushit (сушить) "to dry".

Typical ingredients are flour, eggs, water, and salt, which are combined into a firm dough. This is then cut and rolled into thin strips of about half a centimetre thickness which are formed into rings, briefly cooked in boiling sugar water, then baked in an oven. The rings are generally about 3 to 5 cm in size. Sushki are sometimes topped with poppy seeds.

Traditionally, sushki were strung on a string for selling on the street or at regional markets. Nowadays, industrially produced pre-packaged sushki are sold in food shops all over the countries of the former Soviet Union. In other countries, packaged sushki can be found in markets that sell Russian foods.

== Similar products and common names ==
Sushki belong to a class of Eastern European ring-shaped bread products which are briefly boiled before baking. Belarusian and Russian baranki are larger and softer, but still rather dense such that they are often dipped into tea like sushki. Ukrainian bubliki and Polish obwarzanki krakowski are even larger and softer, but not as soft as Jewish bagels. All such products are also commonly referred to as bubliki in Russian and Ukrainian. Alternatively, they are called generically baranki in Russian, obarinki in Ukrainian and abaranki in Belarusian. "Baranka-type products" (Russian: бараночные изделия, romanized: baranochnye izdeliya) is a formal designation of the product class. Bublitchki, a diminutive of bubliki, is sometimes used to denote small-size products of this class, in particular, sushki.

Taralli are similar Italian bread rings.

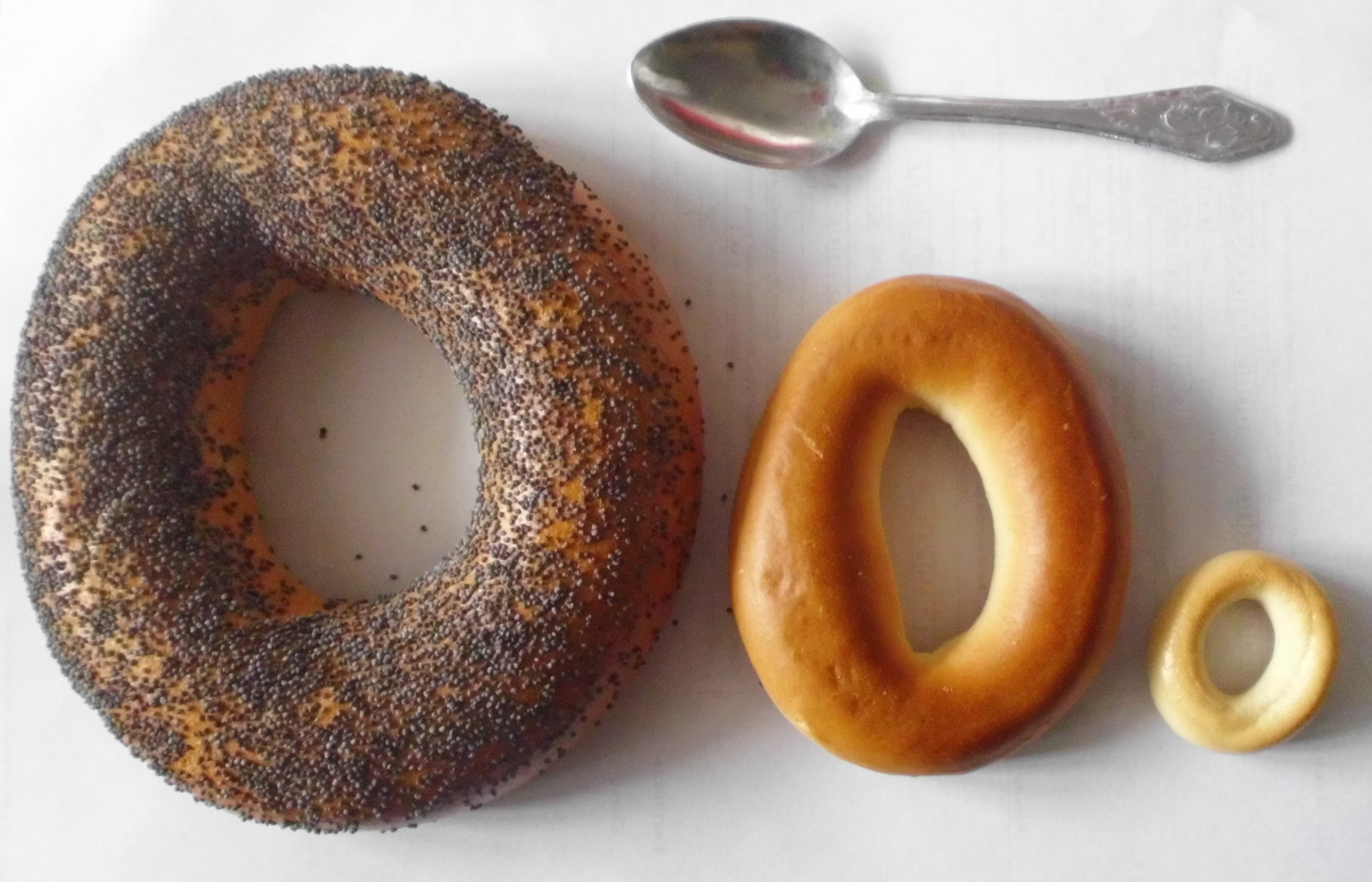
Bublik, baranka and sushka

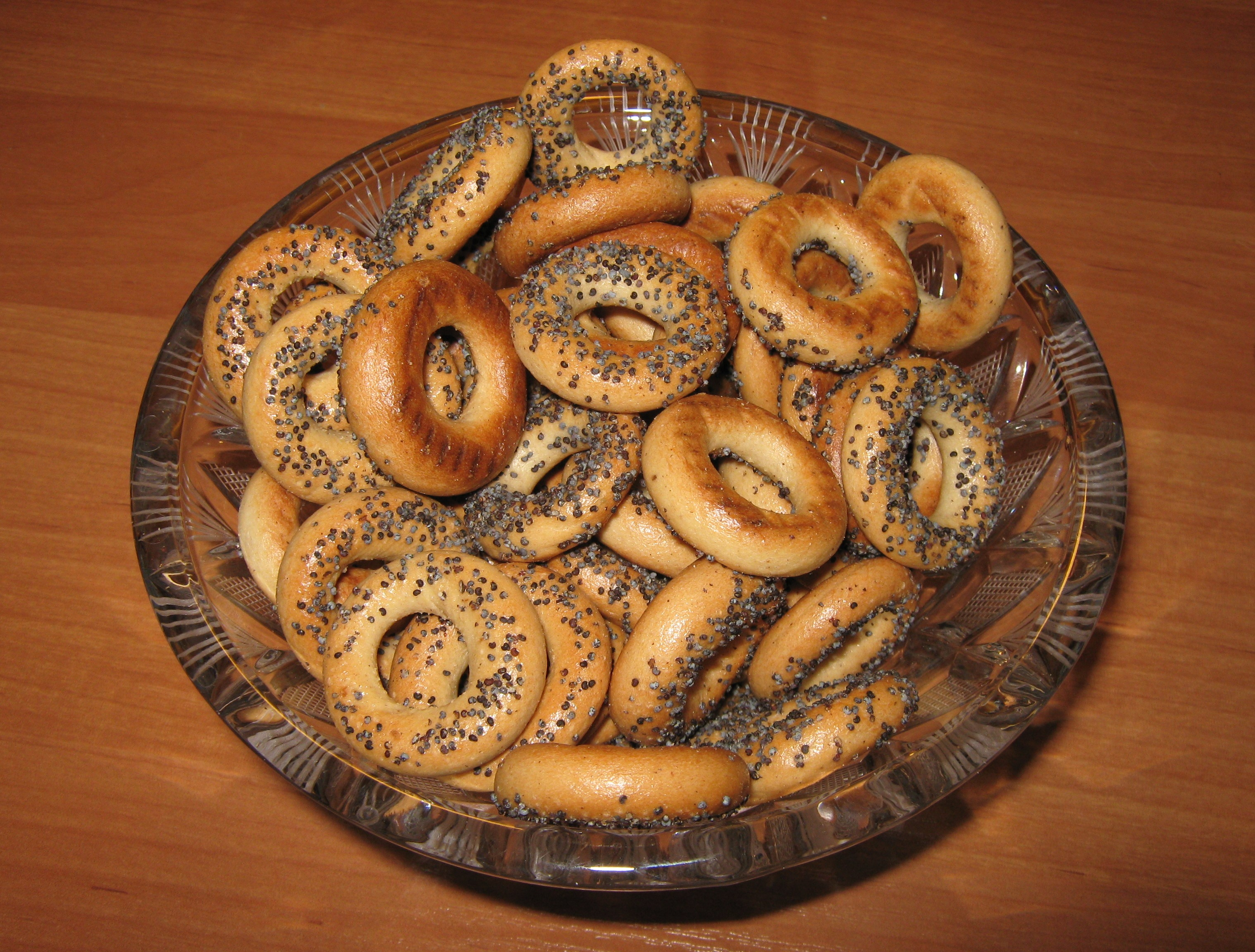
Poppy-seed sushki

== See also ==
- Bublik
- List of Russian desserts
