= Obarzanek =

Obarzanek may refer to:

- Gideon Obarzanek (born 1966), Australian choreographer
- alternative spelling of obwarzanek, a Polish bread
