= Bublik =

Ring-shaped bread roll

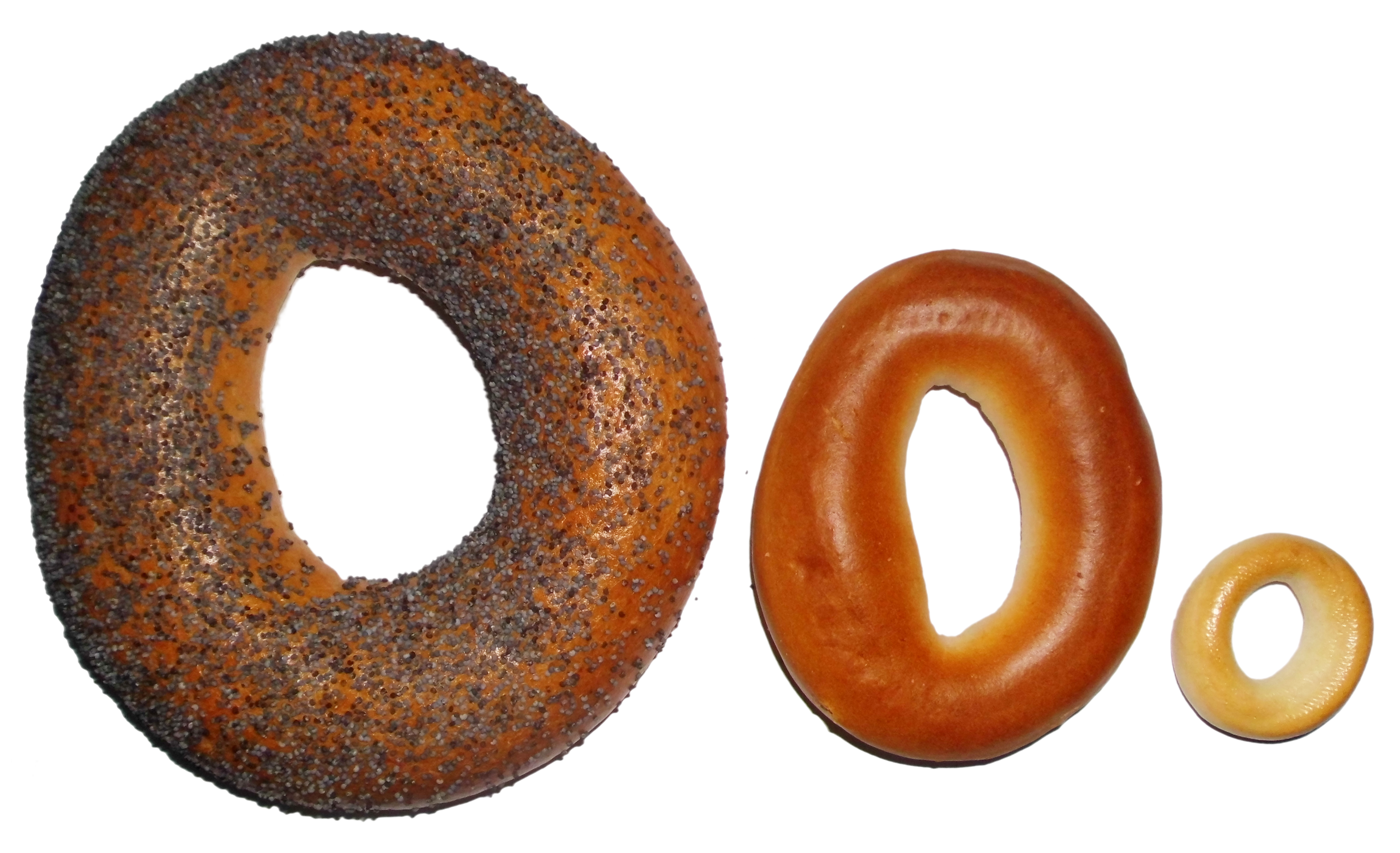
- Poppy seed bublik, baranka and sushka
- Alternative names: Baranka
- Type: Bread
- Place of origin: Ukraine (bublyk), Belarus (abaranak)
- Region or state: Eastern Europe
- Associated cuisine: Belarus, Lithuania, Russia, Ukraine
- Main ingredients: Flour, milk, sugar, butter, salt, egg whites

Bublik (also booblik or bublyk; Russian: бублик, romanized: búblik, plural: bubliki; Ukrainian: бублик, romanized: búblyk) is a traditional Eastern European bread roll. It is a ring of yeast-leavened wheat dough that has been boiled in water for a short time before baking.

== Etymology ==
Bublik stems from Old East Slavic бубьлъ (bubl), ultimately from Proto-Slavic *bǫbьlь, from which Polish bąbel, Czech boubel and Slovak bublina also originated. All these words mean "bubble".

Russian baranka or baranok is a contraction of the word obvaranok (обваранок), "scalded"/"parboiled". Belarusian abaranak, Ukrainian ob[v]arinok and Polish obwarzanek share the same etymology. The Russian spelling suggests that the word was adopted into Russian from Belarusian.

== Common names and types ==
A class of such ring-shaped rolls is common for Eastern European cuisines. Ukrainian bublik is similar to an Ashkenazi Jewish bagel, but is somewhat bigger and has a larger hole. Bubliks usually have a drier, denser and "chewier" texture than bagels. Russian baranka (Russian: баранка; pl. baranki) is a dough ring somewhat smaller than a bublik, but also thinner and drier. Sushka (Russian: сушка; pl. sushki) is an even smaller and drier type, generally about 5 cm (2 in) in size, and has the consistency of a hard cracker.

In Russian and Ukrainian, bublik is often used as a generic designation for any ring-shaped product of this type. In Russian, baranka is also used as a similar generic term, whereas "baranka-type products" (Russian: бараночные изделия, romanized: baranochnye izdeliya) is a formal designation of the product class. A cognate term, obarinok (обарінок) or obvarinok (обварінок), is sometimes used as a synonym for bublik or baranka in Ukrainian. Bublik or baranka is known as abaranak (абаранак) in Belarusian and riestainis or baronkos in Lithuanian.

Polish obwarzanek is done with the same technology as bublik or baranka, but its most common form, obwarzanek krakowski, has a braided ring shape.

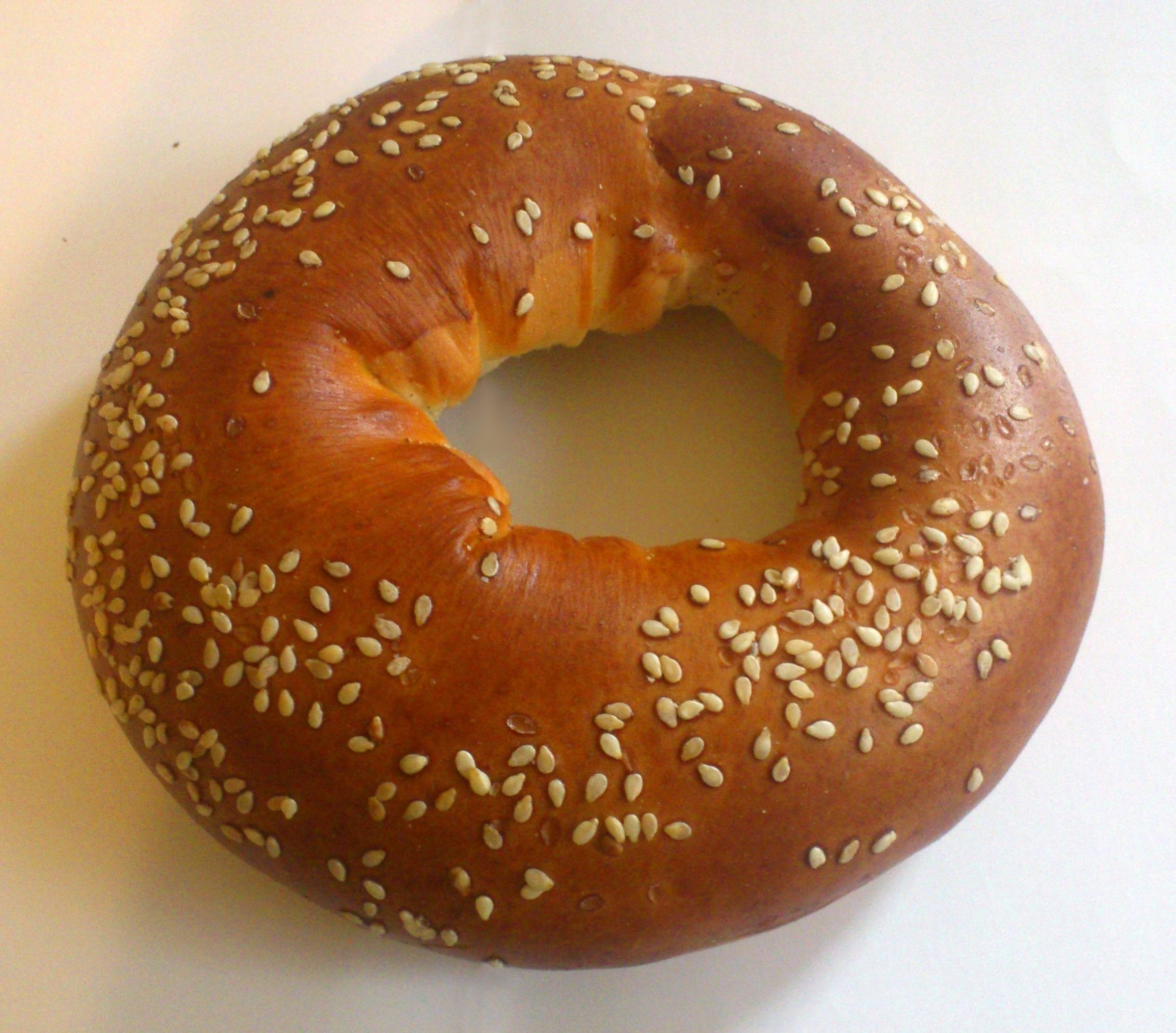
Ukrainian bublik topped with sesame

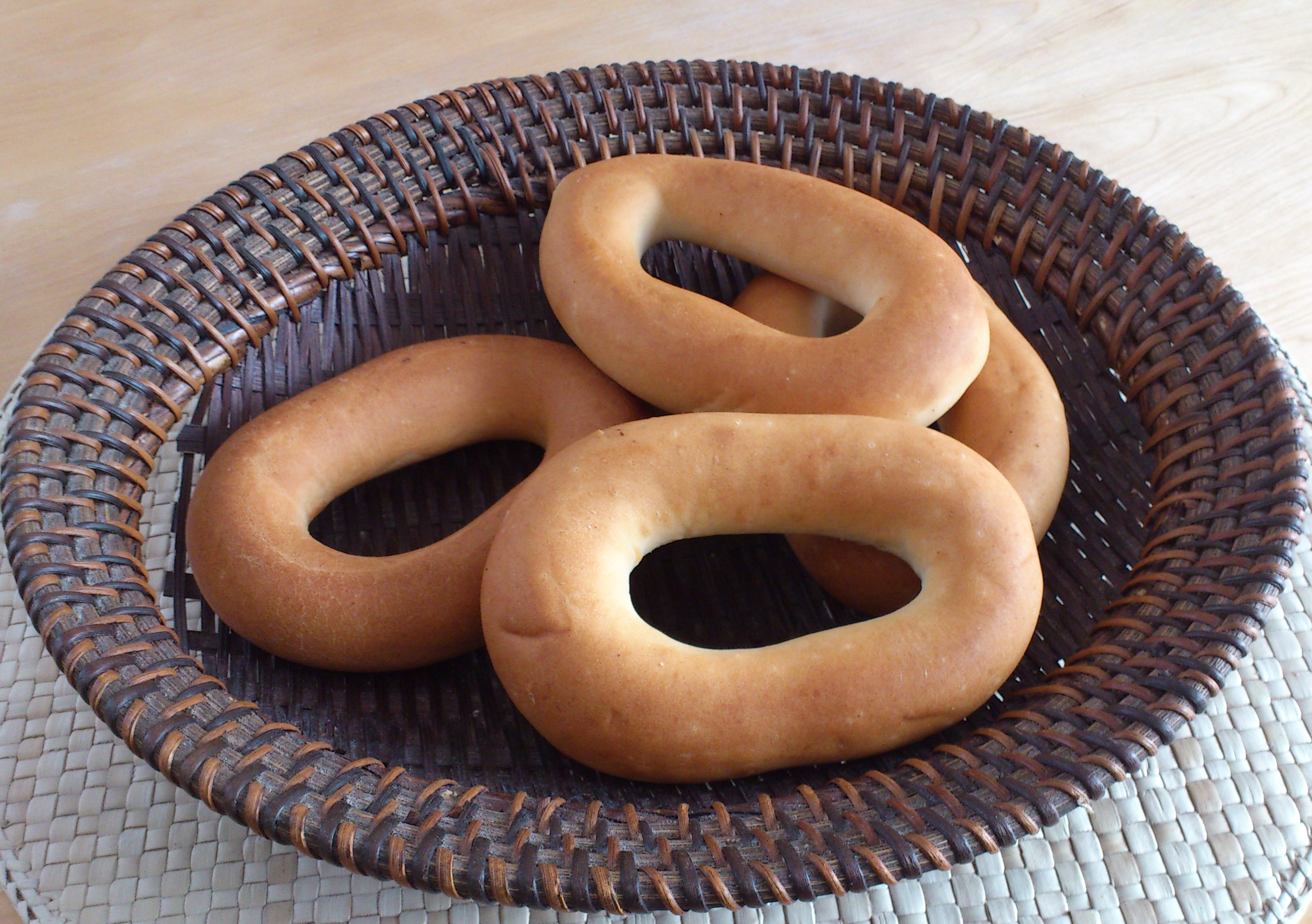
Russian baranki

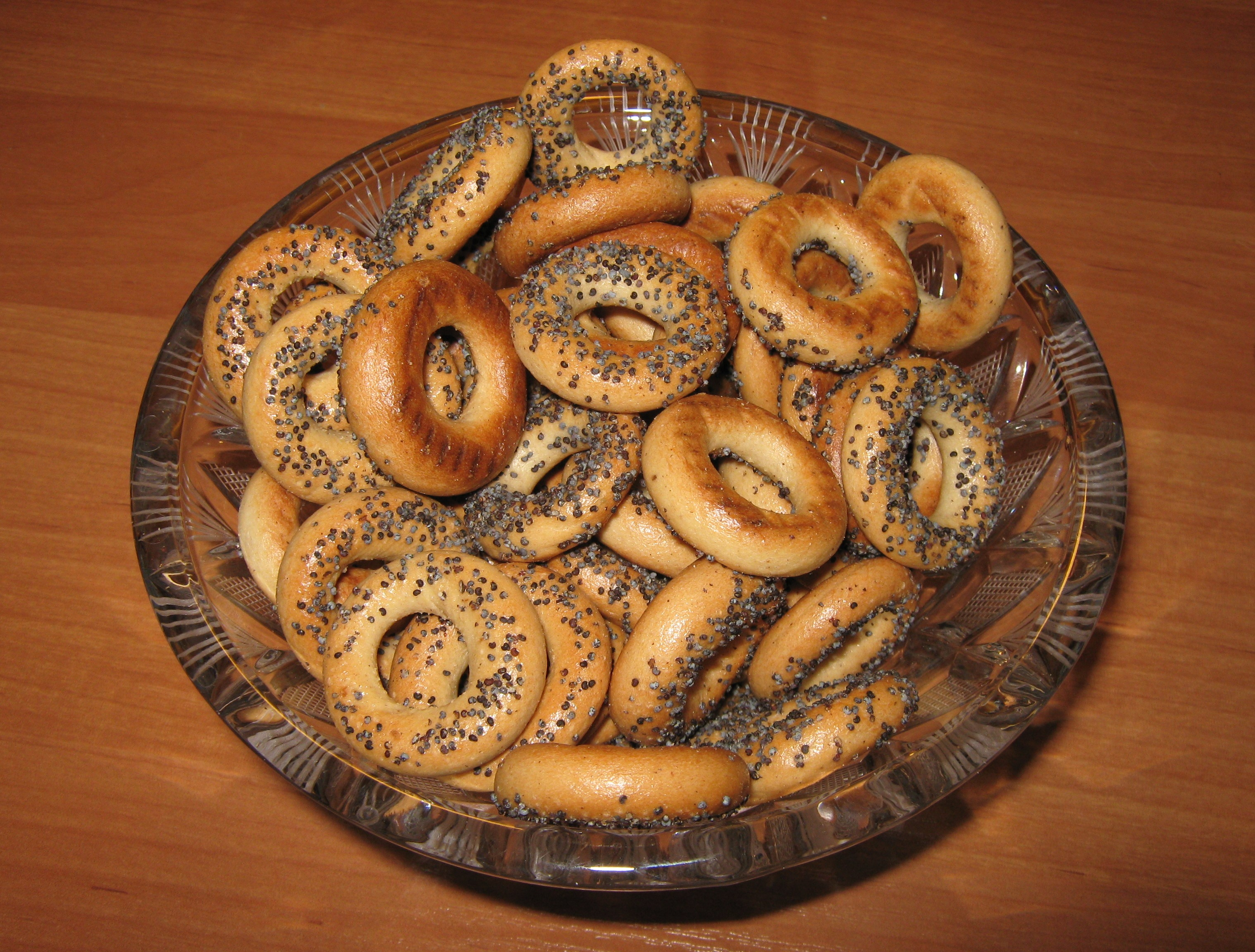
Sushki topped with poppy seeds

== History ==
The first known written mention of the bagel is found in the Community Regulations of the city of Kraków in 1610. The bagel spread through Poland across all areas with significant Jewish population, reaching Ukraine, where it got its current form. The word bublik was adopted from Ukrainian to Russian in which it is first documented in the 18th century. It is mentioned as "wheat bublik" (бублик пшеничнои) in the Lexicon or Alphabetic Collection of Speeches from Russian to Dutch by Jacob Bruce published in 1717 in Saint Petersburg.

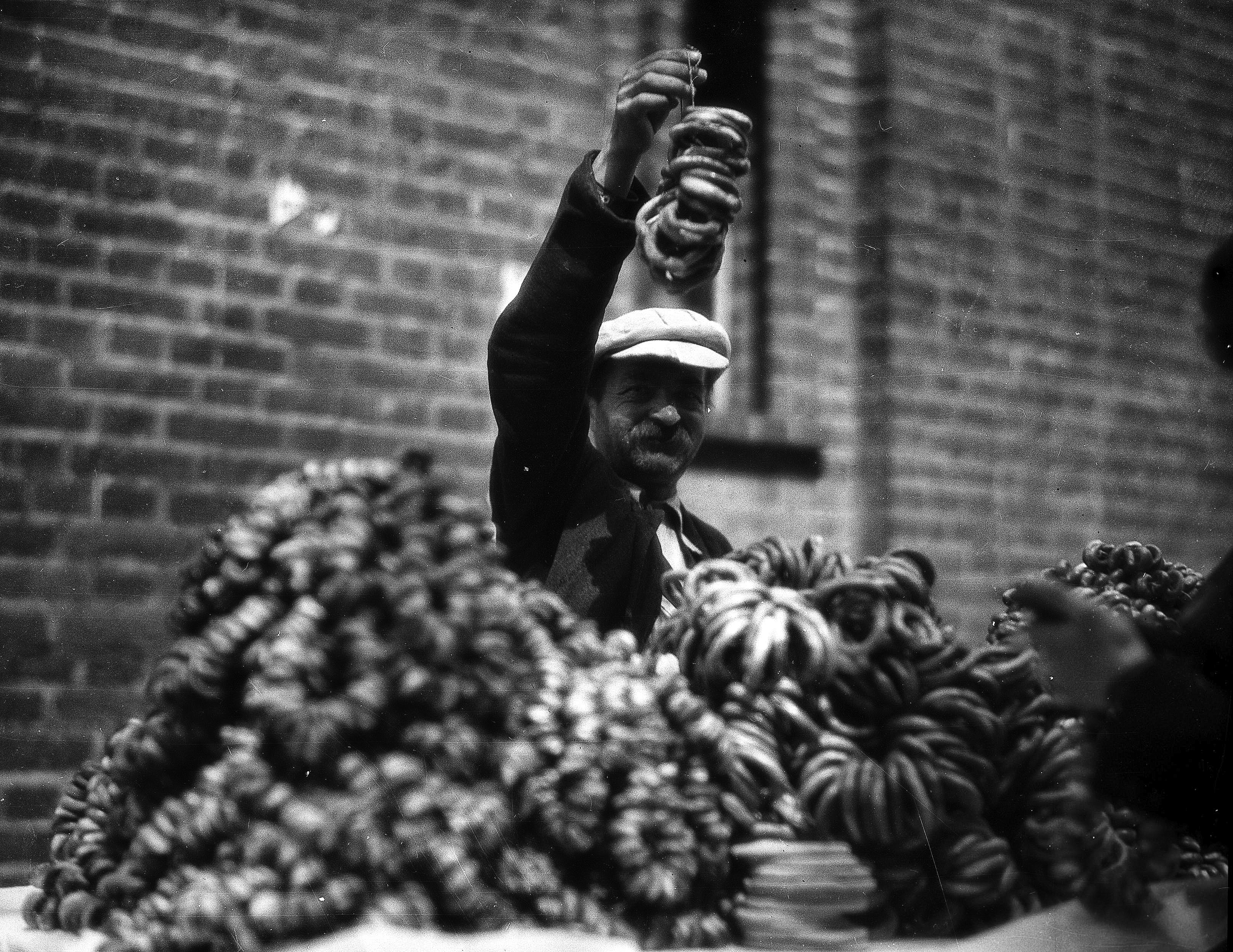
An obwarzanki salesman at Saint Casimir's Fair in Vilnius, 1935

The baranka is first mentioned in Russian sources in a 17th-century text. An entry for the year 1665 in the account ledger of Valday Iversky Monastery reads: "Baranki and eggs purchased for the brothers in Bogoroditsino village for ten altyn." In the 19th century, the town of Valday was famous for its baranki. Valday baranki were mentioned by Alexander Pushkin, Alexander Radishchev and others.

William Pokhlyobkin traces the origin of Russian baranka to what is now Belarus, in particular to the town of Smarhon’ (the former Grand Duchy of Lithuania). Until they were murdered in the Holocaust, most of the population of Smarhon' was Jewish. Baranki were supposedly used to feed bears in the local school of bear training (the so-called "Bear Academy"). Written accounts of Smarhon' baranki appeared in the 19th century. Adam Kirkor wrote in the encyclopedia Picturesque Russia: "In Smorgon', Oshmyany district, Vilna province, almost all the petty bourgeois population is busy baking small bubliki, or kringles, which are widely known as Smorgon' obvaranki. Each traveller would definitely buy several bundles of these bubliki; besides, they are transported to Vilna and other cities." Władysław Syrokomla mentioned Smarhon' as "the capital of obwarzanki famous in all Lithuania". Smarhon' obwarzanki were a traditional treat at Saint Casimir's Fair in Vilnius.

== Preparation ==
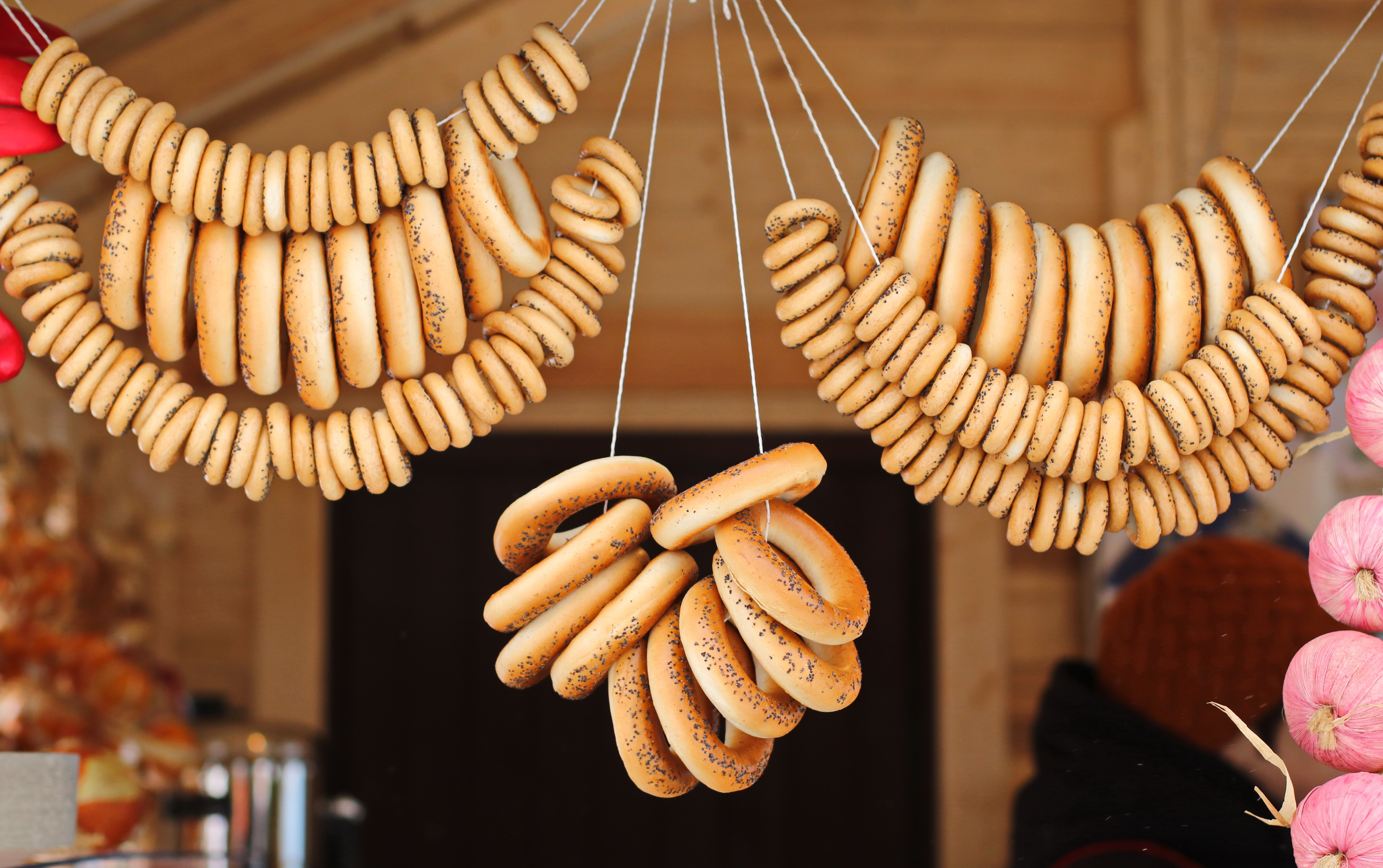
Bubliki and sushki on strings

Bubliks are made from yeast-leavened wheat dough that commonly contains milk, butter, and egg whites and is rather sweet. Poppy seeds are a popular addition to the dough, as well as several other fillings. For savory bubliks, sugar is omitted and instead grated cheese and a few drops of onion juice can be added. Bubliks are featured by professional bakers in their shops and at country fairs and regional markets. They are usually strung on a string by the dozen.

In Belarus, Russia and Ukraine bubliks and barankas are usually treated not like bread, but like a type of pastry, eaten as a complement to tea or coffee. Therefore, bublik dough is generally sweeter and denser than that of bagel dough, and they are usually glazed with egg yolk. By far the most popular variety of bublik has a liberal amount of poppy seeds added to it.

== Consumption ==
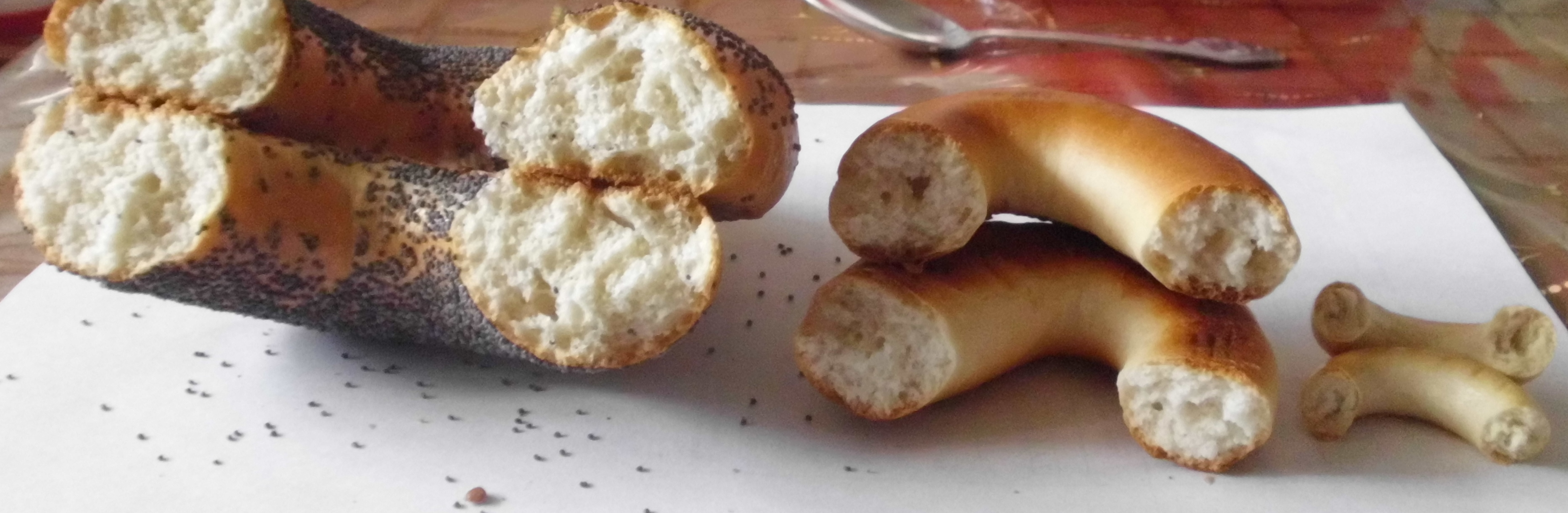
Cross section of bublik, baranka and sushka

Bubliks are usually eaten as is, but it is not uncommon to dip them into tea, a practice that came from eating sushki and baranki, which were very similar in taste, but rather dry and hard and not easily palatable unless moistened.

Another common way of eating bubliks is to break them into several fragments and to eat them with jam (varenye), sour cream (smetana), or other similar dips. While they often accompany tea, bubliks, again unlike modern bagels, are rarely considered a breakfast food.

== Cultural references ==
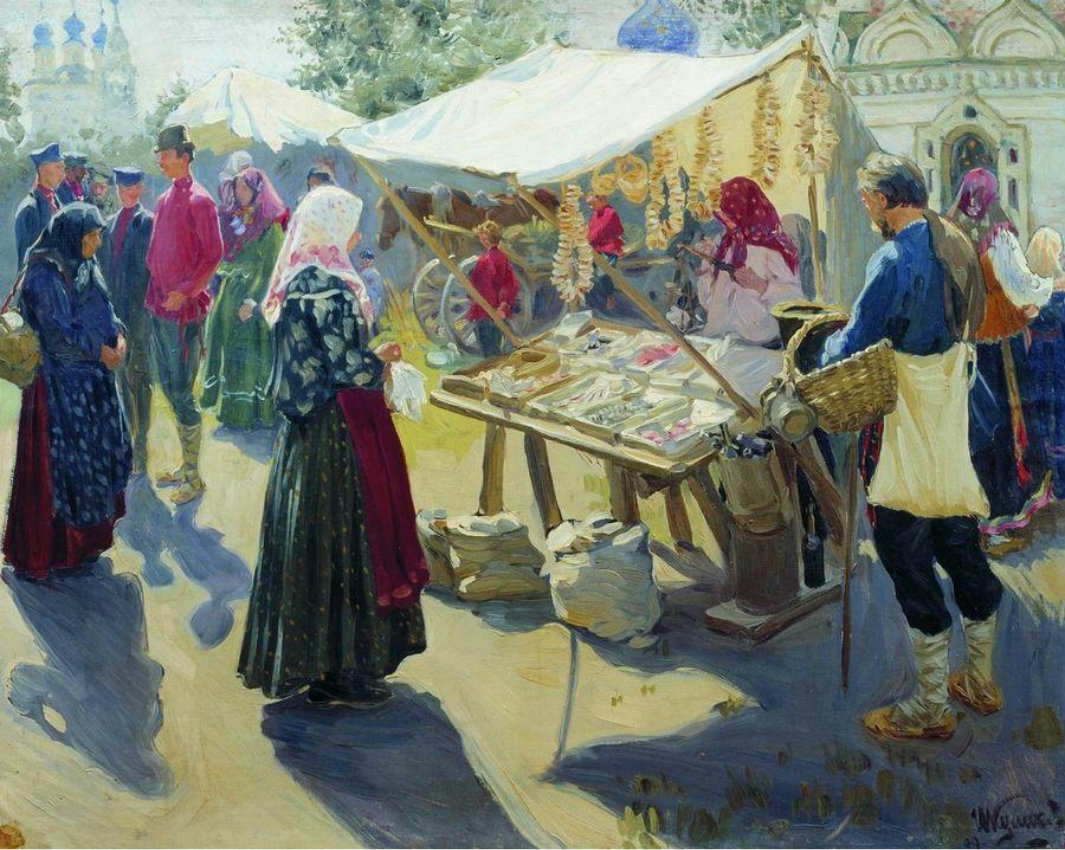
Ivan Kulikov, Market with baranki, 1910

A short poem called Protoptala stezhku cherez yar ("I beat a path through the ravine") in Kobzar book by Ukrainian poet Taras Shevchenko refers to a young woman who sells bubliki at the market to the Cossacks.

Bublichki, a diminutive of bubliki, is a title of a famous Yiddish-Ukrainian-Russian song written in Odesa in the 1920s. Leonid Utyosov popularised the song in the USSR. The Barry Sisters together with the Ziggy Elman Orchestra made it popular in the US in 1939. Today it belongs to the repertoire of klezmer, jazz and pop musicians.

A common Russian and Ukrainian phrase is "a hole from a bublik" (Russian: дырка от бу́блика, romanized: dyrka ot búblika, Ukrainian: ді́рка з (від) бу́блика, romanized: dírka z (vid) búblyka), which means "absolutely nothing" or "worthless". Examples:

- I worked so hard, and what did I get for it? A hole from a bublik,
- He is not worth a hole from a bublik.

This expression in literature is found in Mystery-Bouffe, a socialist dramatic play written by Vladimir Mayakovsky in 1918–1921:

Someone got a bublik and another one got the hole of the bublik.
So that is to be a democratic republic.

== See also ==
- Sushki
- List of bread rolls
