= Bagel Bakers Local 338 =

New York City trade union (1900s-1970s)

- Merged into: Local 3
- Founded: 1900s
- Dissolved: 1970s

The Bagel Bakers Local 338 was a trade union local that was established in the early 1900s in New York City and whose craftsmen were the primary makers of New York's bagels, prepared by hand, until the advent of machine-made bagels in the 1960s led to its end as an independent organization in the 1970s. It was a local union of the Bakery and Confectionery Workers International Union. Until 1964, the union used a different transliteration and called itself the Beigel Bakers Union.

== Formation ==
Jewish immigrants brought the bagel to the United States at the turn of the 20th century, with hundreds of small bagel bakeries sprouting up in Manhattan's Lower East Side, in which workers worked under difficult conditions for minimal wages. To represent these workers, The International Beigel Bakers Union was established. Local 338 was established by 300 bagel craftsmen who joined together in Manhattan, establishing standards for bagel production by hand and mandating that new spots in the union be handed to sons of existing local members. All of the local's members were Jewish and meetings were conducted in Yiddish. By 1915, the local had contracts with 36 bakeries in the New York City area.

The bagels they prepared by hand weighed about 2 to 3 ounces (57 to 85 g), with bagels commonly prepared by the 1990s typically being double that size, or larger. These smaller and denser bagels were made with high-gluten flour, mixed with malt syrup, salt, water and yeast, using a zealously guarded recipe, and would become hard after about six hours. They would be rolled into strips two inches (5.1 cm) in diameter and formed by hand into bagels, boiled in hot water for one minute and then placed to bake in an oven. The finished products were delivered to customers on strings of five dozen bagels. The profession was divided into the bench men, who were responsible for kneading, shaping and boiling the bagels, with the oven men finishing the job.

== Labor actions and wage history ==
A December 1951 labor dispute between Local 338 and the Bagel Bakers Association closed 32 of the city's bagel bakeries, leading to what The New York Times called a "bagel famine", with the two remaining bakeries unable to keep up with the 1.2 million weekly demand for the product. As a result of the work stoppage, area delicatessens reported that sales of lox had dropped by as much as 30 to 50%. Murray Nathan, who had successfully resolved a smoked salmon strike in 1948, was brought in by the New York State Board of Mediation to help get the two sides to meet. Local 338 had settled by late January, but the bagel outage lasted until early February, when the Bagel Bakers Association reached a deal to compensate the drivers who deliver the bagels for the wages lost during the seven-week stoppage.

While a threatened 1956 strike was averted when Local 338 members received an additional $6 (equivalent to $71 in 2025) in weekly wages, bringing pay to between $70 and $138 (equivalent to $830 to $1630 in 2025) per week, a 33-day-long strike in 1957 was ended with further improvements in salaries and benefits for 350 striking workers at 34 area bakeries.

By 1960, the local's 350 workers were producing 250,000 bagels each day. For a 37-hour work week, a bench man was paid $144 and an oven man $150 (equivalent to $1570 and $1630 in 2025), with opportunities to more than double that in overtime when demand required.

Local 338 went out on strike in February 1962, leading to an estimated 85% drop in the bagel supply. Ten bakeries, half in New Jersey, had signed contracts with the union, while 29 other bakeries were shut down in the job action, leaving New York City and adjoining Nassau County hardest hit by the closures. Local 338 was seeking a third week of paid vacation and three more paid holidays. Employers countered with an offer of one additional paid holiday and wage increases that could be applied as the union saw fit. In the two-year agreement reached on March 8 to settle the month-long strike, workers would receive an additional $2 daily in the first year, on top of the $25 to $26 per day received under the one-year agreement that had just ended. Workers would receive another $1 per day in the second year of the contract and a third paid week of vacation, in addition to other benefit changes and the two dozen bagels per day each member was already entitled to receive.

Employers staged a lockout of Local 338 in February 1967, after they demanded a 40% wage reduction, citing losses incurred by the bagel bakeries due to competition from non-union shops, frozen bagels brought in from outside the area and companies using automated equipment. At the time, Local 338 was willing to consider rollbacks to individual bakeries on a case-by-case basis for those companies that would open their books and demonstrate financial need for the wage cuts.

== Demise ==
The union controlled the bagel market for decades, until the advent of automation in the 1960s, when Canadian Daniel Thompson invented the Thompson Bagel Machine. Lender's Bagels in New Haven, Connecticut, started using the machines in 1962, helping turn the bagel into a readily available commodity. The bagel-making machinery could produce 300 dozen bagels in the time that two men working together could roll 125 dozen. The union ended its independent life in the early 1970s when it merged into a broader baker's union.

At some point between 1970 and 1973, during the time Harry Rubenstein was President of Local 3 of the Bakery and Confectionery Workers International Union of America, Local 338 merged with Local 3.
