= Smarhon (air base) =

Smarhonʹ
- Smarhonʹ, Grodno Region in Belarus

Site information
- Type: Air Base
- Operator: Soviet Air Forces

Location
- Shown within Belarus
- Coordinates: 54°31′24″N 026°18′24″E

Site history
- Built: 1956

Airfield information
- Elevation: 170 metres (558 ft) AMSL
Runways
| Direction | Length and surface |
|---|---|
| 16/34 | 2,000 metres (6,562 ft) Concrete |

Smarhon (also Smorgon and Smorgon Northwest) is a former Soviet Air Forces base in Belarus located 8 km northwest of Smarhonʹ. It was a small airfield with an unpaved revetment complex hidden in the forest to the northwest, that operated as a IRBM facility until 1990. The airfield and IRBM facility is currently abandoned and increasingly overgrown.

The base was home to the 405th Fighter Aviation Regiment between 1956 and 1960 with the Mikoyan-Gurevich MiG-15 (ASCC: Fagot).

After 1960, a facility for R-14 Chusovaya IRBMs was in operation, with eight surface launch pads and three silos. In 1978, these missiles were withdrawn and it became a base for the mobile RT-21M Pioner IRBMs until 1990.
