= Nunt =

Walnut honey confection traditionally eaten on Purim

- Type: Candy
- Main ingredients: Dark forest honey, sugar, walnuts
- Variations: Poppy seeds, ginger, sesame

Nunt, or noent, is a candy originating from Ashkenazi Jewish cuisine which vaguely resembles nougat or brittle. The candy is predominantly served at the Jewish celebration of Purim, where self-made sweets are customarily given to neighbours and friends. Nunt is traditionally made from dark forest honey, which is cooked along with sugar and then mixed with coarsely cut walnuts. The result is placed on a smooth, wet board or an oiled marble plate, left to cool, and then cut into small rhombic-shaped pieces.

Variants of nunt may also include poppy seeds (mohn pletzlach or mohnlach), or honey enriched with ginger (ingberlach), or sesame seeds or sesame paste.
