= Taralli =

Italian snack food

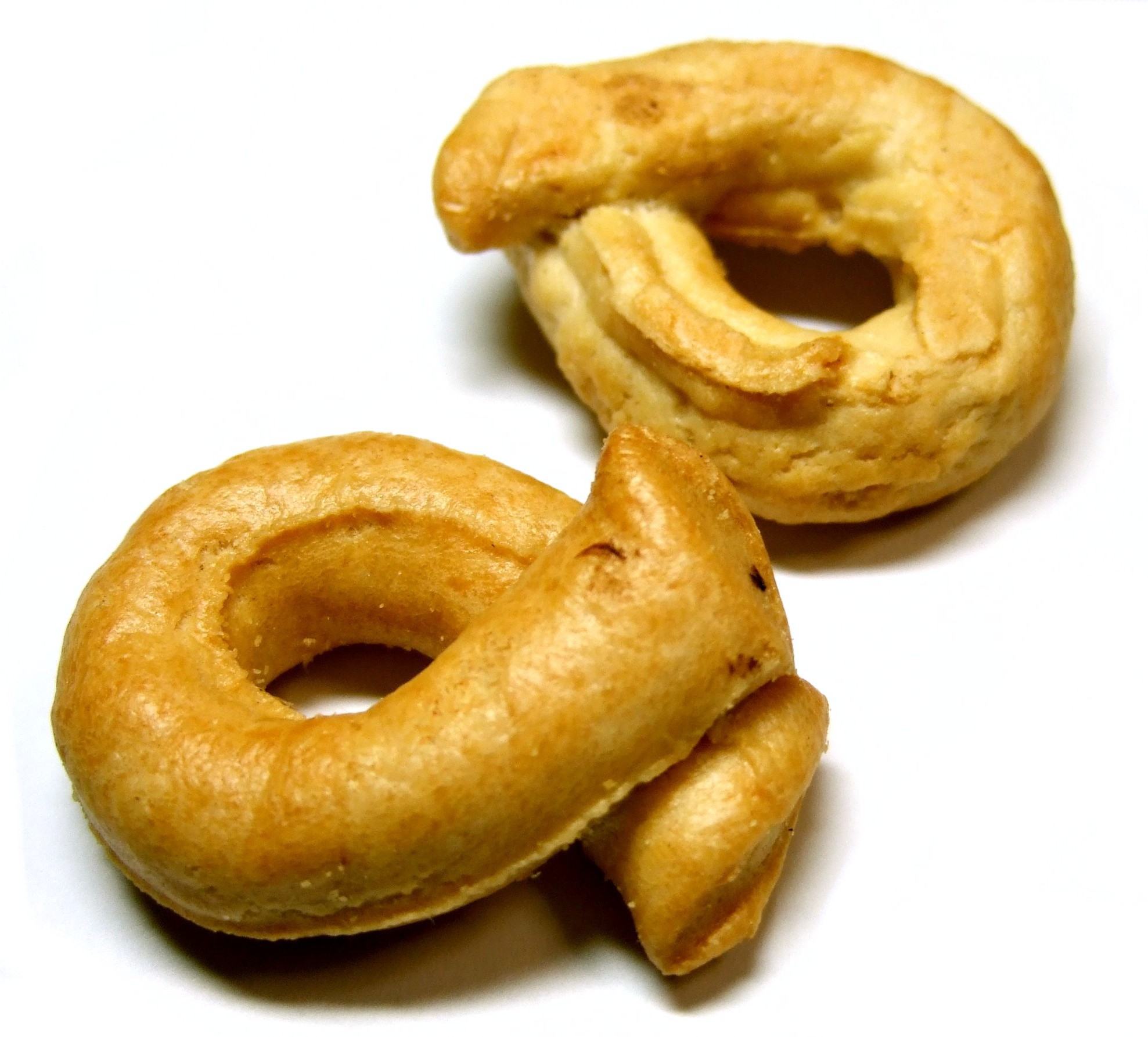
- Tarallini
- Type: Cracker
- Place of origin: Italy
- Region or state: Southern Italy
- Main ingredients: Wheat flour, yeast, water, olive oil, fennel seeds, black pepper
- Variations: Tarallini

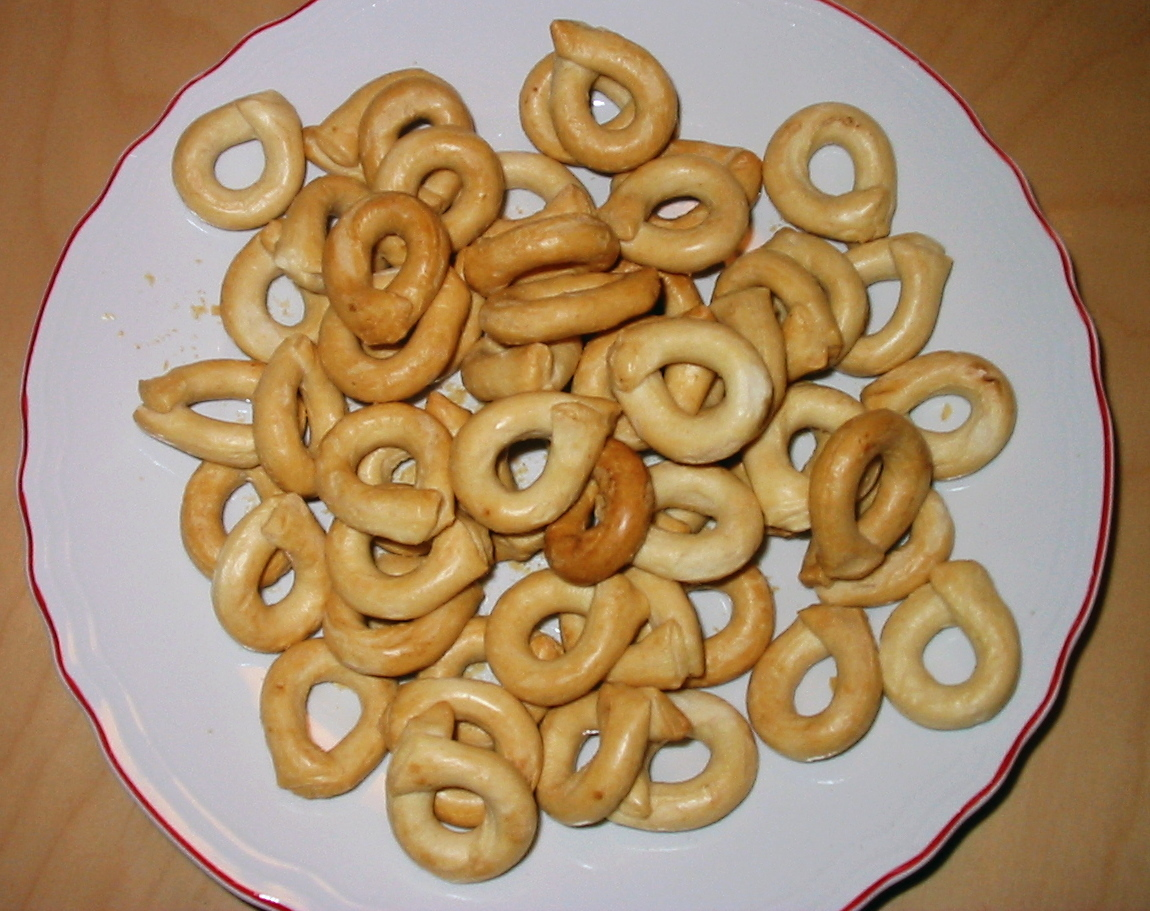
Tarallini

Taralli (sing.: tarallo) are toroidal Italian snack foods, common in southern Italy. Wheat-based crackers similar in texture to breadsticks, taralli can be sweet or savory.

Taralli are classically formed into rings or ovals about 10 to 12.5 cm (3.9 to 4.9 in) in circumference. Smaller taralli, called tarallini, with a circumference of 3.8 to 7.8 cm (1.5 to 3.1 in), are sold commercially. The dough may be made with olive oil or lard. Historically, taralli were made with lard, which produces a flakier product. According to Canadian author Malcolm Gladwell in his book Outliers, "Sweets such as biscotti and taralli used to be reserved for Christmas and Easter; in Roseto they were eaten year-round."

Before World War II, the coastal Mergellina region of Naples was known for its taralli consumption. Poor families would eat taralli with almonds on the beach. Food writer Arthur Schwartz says they were made by the wives of fishermen.

After World War II, the area underwent urban renewal. By the 1990s, taralli were sold by vendors from carts, alongside chips and other snacks, and Neapolitans complained that the culture had ended. Elsewhere, taralli were sold at specialty bakeries, in flavors such as fennel and sun-dried tomato. They were particularly popular in the comune of Caserta.

== See also ==
- Pretzel
