= Bagel =

Ring-shaped bread product

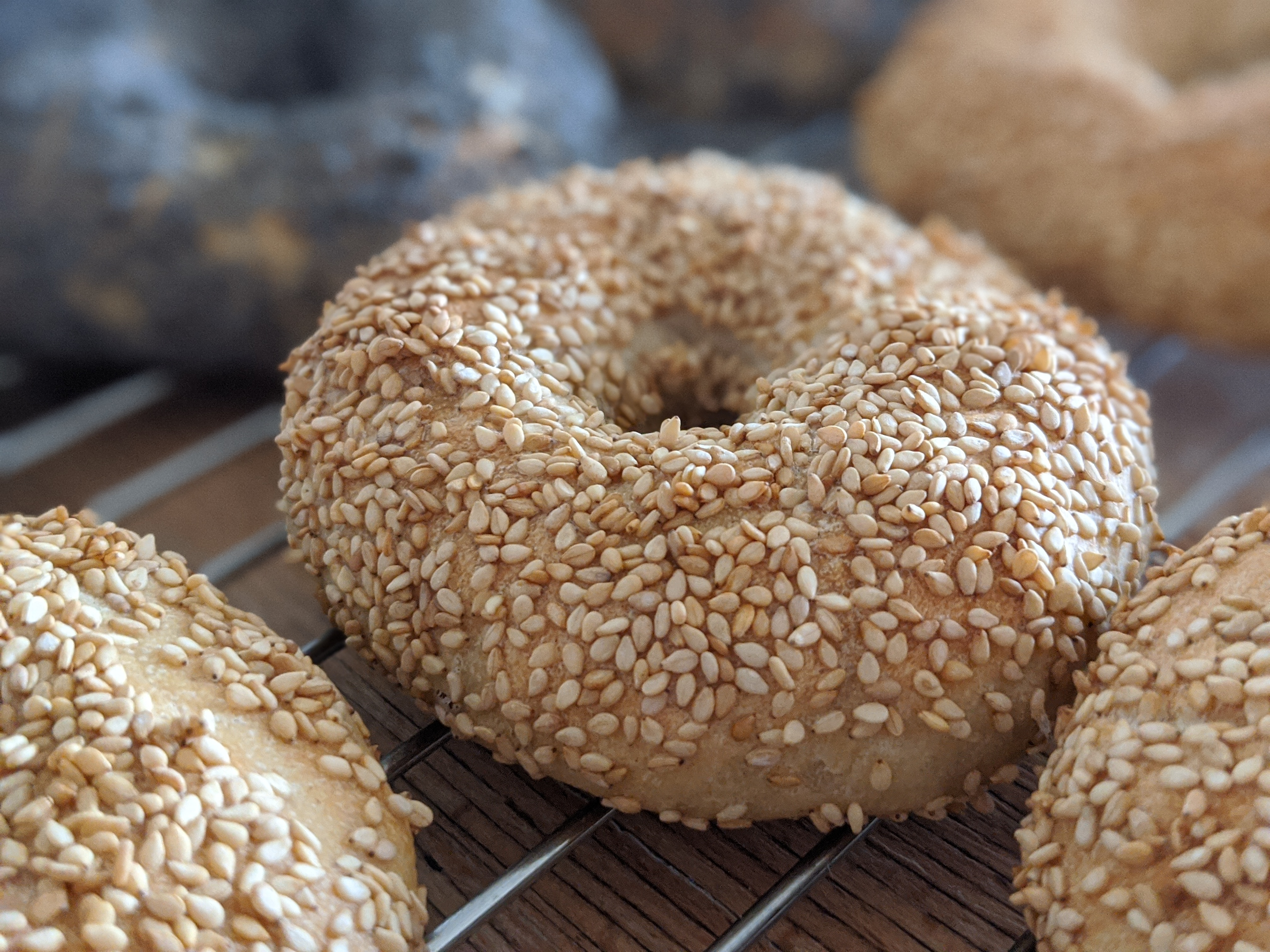
- Sesame bagel
- Alternative names: Bajgiel, beigel, beygl
- Type: Bread roll
- Place of origin: Poland
- Region or state: Europe, North America
- Associated cuisine: Jewish, Polish, American, Canadian
- Created by: Jewish communities of Poland
- Serving temperature: Room temperature
- Main ingredients: Wheat flour, water, salt, yeast
- Ingredients generally used: Barley malt syrup, honey, sugar, sesame seeds, poppy seeds
- Variations: Montreal-style bagel, pizza bagel, bagel toast
- Similar dishes: Obwarzanek krakowski, bublik, simit, taralli, Ka'ak
- Other information: Traditionally boiled before baking

A bagel (Yiddish: בײגל, romanized: beygl; Polish: bajgiel [ˈbajɡʲɛl]; also spelled beigel) is a bread roll originating in the Jewish communities of Poland. Bagels are traditionally made from yeasted wheat dough that is shaped by hand into a torus or ring, briefly boiled in water, and then baked. The result is a dense, chewy, doughy interior with a browned and sometimes crisp exterior.

Bagels are often topped with seeds baked on the outer crust—traditional choices include poppy and sesame seeds—or with salt grains. Different dough types include whole-grain and rye. The basic roll-with-a-hole design, hundreds of years old, allows even cooking and baking of the dough; it also allows groups of bagels to be gathered on a string or dowel for handling, transportation, and retail display.

Bagels have been widely associated with Ashkenazi Jews since the 17th century; they were first mentioned in 1610 in Jewish community ordinances in Kraków, Poland.

Bagels are now a popular bread product in North America and Poland, especially in cities with a large Jewish population. Bagels are also sold (fresh or frozen, often in many flavors) in supermarkets.

== History ==
Circular boiled-and-baked bread rolls (such as ka'ak, obwarzanek, taralli, and simit) have a long and diverse history across Europe and western Asia. Obwarzanek, a boiled-then-baked ring-shaped bread, was made by the 13th century Kraków baker's guild for Lent, as seen in royal family accounts from 1394. Ka'ak, another early boiled-then-baked ring-shaped bread, is referenced in the 10th century Arabic cookbook Kitab al Tabikh and a recipe is described in the 13th century Arabic cookbook Kitab al Wusla ila al Habib.

The bagel may have been brought to Kraków by Bona Sforza, a woman from Bari, Italy, who became the Queen of Poland and Grand Duchess of Lithuania as the second wife of Sigismund the Old from 1518 to 1548. There is some evidence that the bagel may have been derived from pretzels made in Germany brought by immigrants to Poland. Linguist Leo Rosten notes in The Joys of Yiddish, that the first known mention of the Polish word bajgiel derived from the Yiddish word bagel in the "Community Regulations" occurs in Kraków in 1610, and that the food was given as a gift to women in childbirth.

In the 16th and first half of the 17th centuries, the bajgiel became a staple of Polish cuisine. The name derives from the Yiddish word beygal, from the German dialect word beugel, meaning "ring" or "bracelet".

In the Brick Lane district and surrounding area of London, England, bagels (locally spelled "beigels") have been sold since the middle of the 19th century. They were often displayed in the windows of bakeries on vertical wooden dowels, up to a metre in length, on racks.

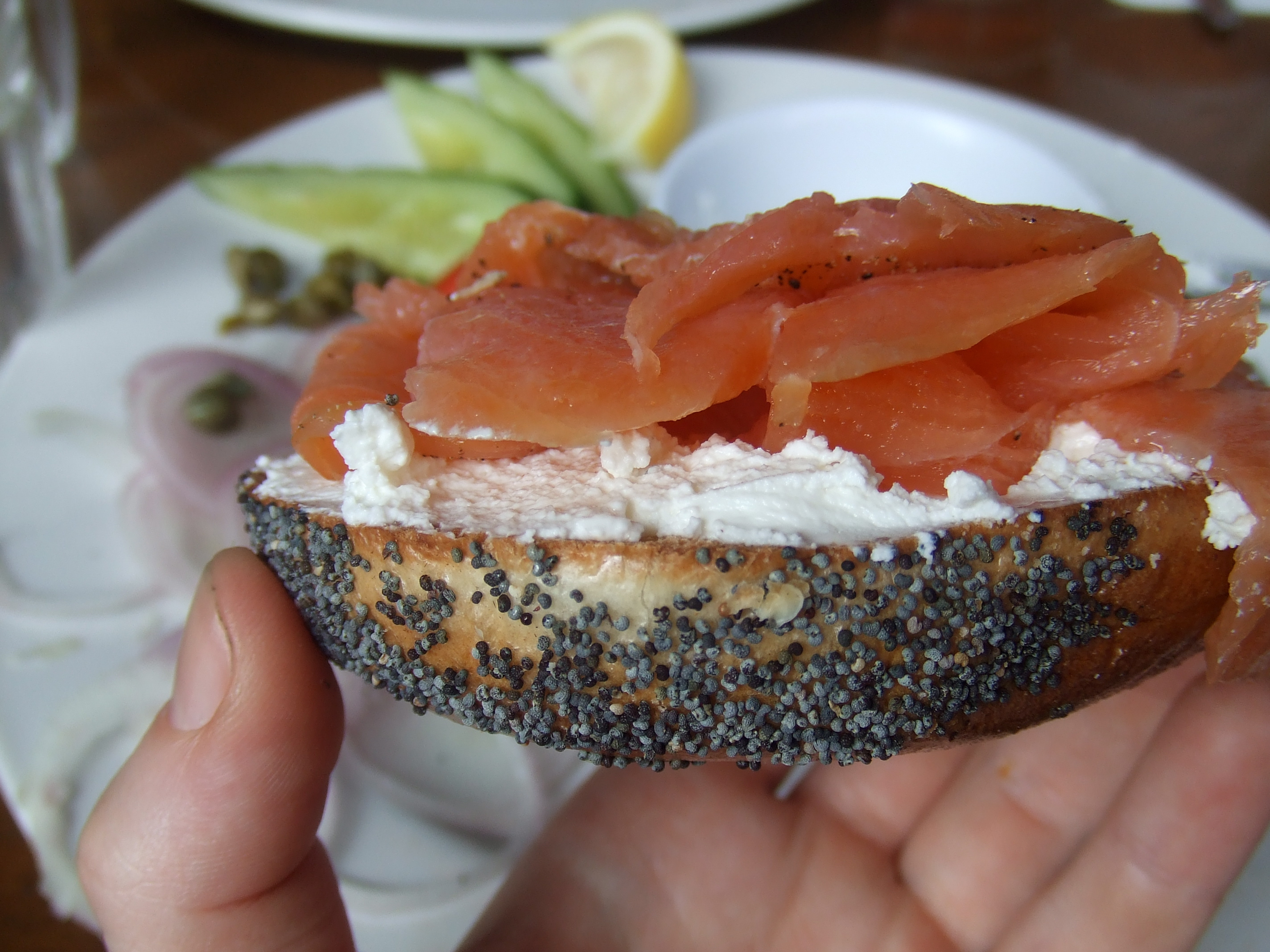
Bagels with cream cheese and lox (cured salmon) are considered a traditional part of American Jewish cuisine (colloquially known as "lox and a schmear").

Bagels were brought to the United States by immigrant Polish Jews, with a thriving business developing in New York City that was controlled for decades by Bagel Bakers Local 338. They had contracts with nearly all bagel bakeries in and around the city for their workers, who prepared all their bagels by hand.

The bagel came into more general use throughout North America in the last quarter of the 20th century with automation. Daniel Thompson started work on the first commercially viable bagel machine in 1958; bagel baker Harry Lender, his son, Murray Lender, and Florence Sender leased this technology and pioneered automated production and distribution of frozen bagels in the 1960s. Murray also invented pre-slicing the bagel.

Around 1900, the "bagel brunch" became popular in New York City. The bagel brunch consists of a bagel topped with lox, cream cheese, capers, tomato, and red onion. This and similar combinations of toppings have remained associated with bagels into the 21st century in the United States.

=== Size change over time ===
Bagels in the U.S. have increased in size over time. Starting at around 2 ounces (60 g), by 1915, the average bagel weighed 3 ounces (90 g); the size began to increase further in the 1960s. By 2003, the average bagel sold on a Manhattan coffee cart weighed around 6 ounces (170 g).

== Preparation and preservation ==
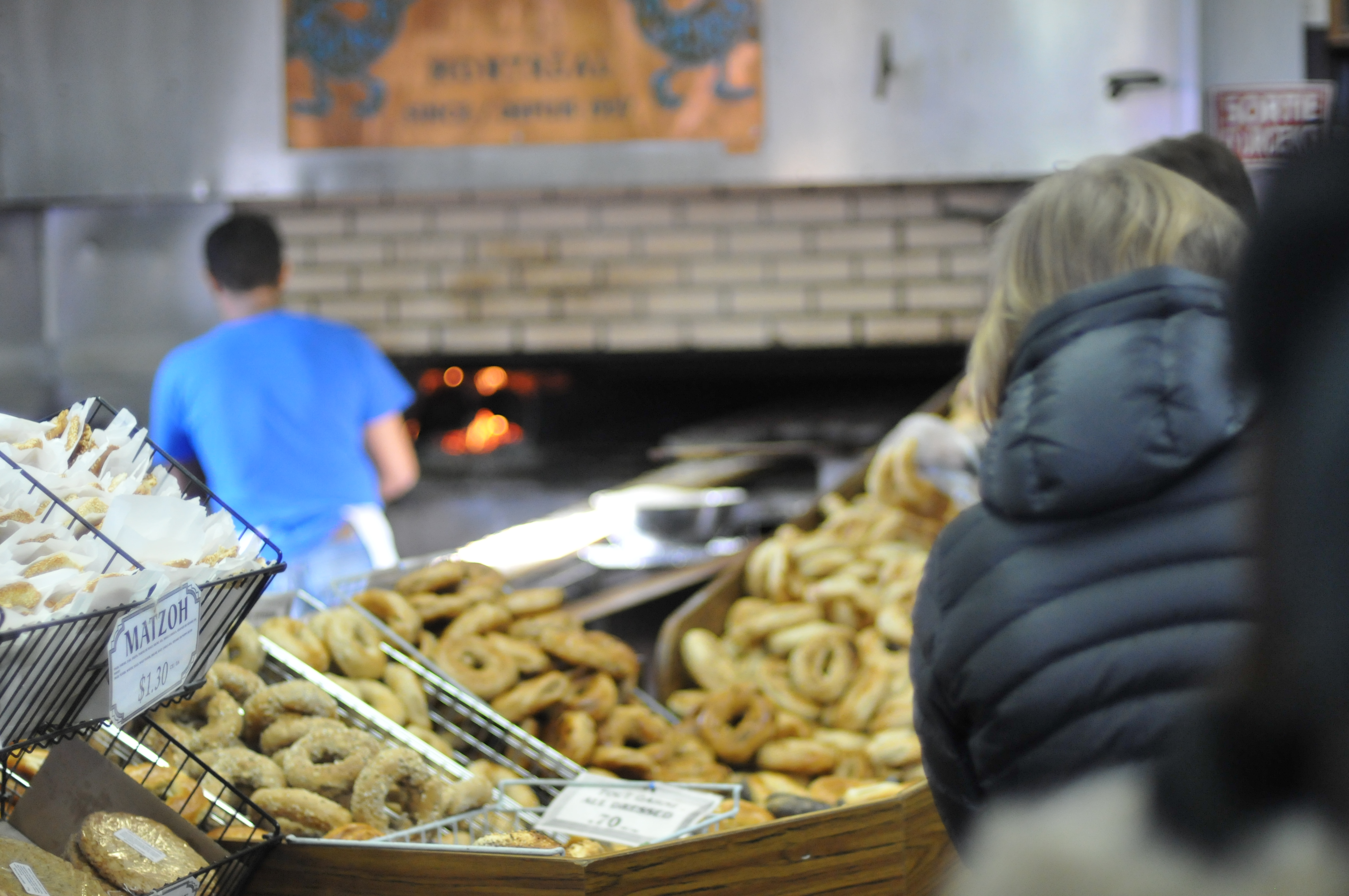
Saturday morning bagel queue at St-Viateur Bagel, Montreal, Quebec

At its most basic, traditional bagel dough contains wheat flour (without germ or bran), salt, water, and yeast leavening. Bread flour or other high gluten flours are preferred to create the firm, dense but spongy bagel shape and chewy texture. With a dough hydration of around 50–57%, bagel dough is among the stiffest bread doughs. Most bagel recipes call for the addition of a sweetener to the dough, often barley malt (syrup or crystals), honey, high fructose corn syrup, or sugar, with or without eggs, milk or butter. Leavening can be accomplished using a sourdough technique or a commercially produced yeast.

Bagels are traditionally made by:

- mixing and kneading the ingredients to form the dough
- shaping the dough into the traditional bagel shape, round with a hole in the middle, from a long thin piece of dough
- proofing the bagels for at least 12 hours at low temperature (40–50 °F (4–10 °C))
- boiling each bagel for 60–90 seconds in water that may contain additives such as lye, baking soda, barley malt syrup, or honey
- baking at a temperature between 347–599 °F (175–315 °C)

This production method gives bagels their distinctive taste, chewy texture, and shiny appearance.

In recent years, a variant has emerged, producing what is sometimes called the steam bagel. To make a steam bagel, the boiling is skipped, and the bagels are instead baked in an oven equipped with a steam injection system. In commercial bagel production, the steam bagel process requires less labor, since bagels need only be directly handled once, at the shaping stage. Thereafter, the bagels need never be removed from their pans as they are refrigerated and then steam-baked. The steam bagel results in a fluffier, softer, less chewy product more akin to a finger roll that happens to be shaped like a bagel. The dough used is intentionally more alkaline to aid browning, because the steam injection process uses neutral water steam instead of an alkaline solution bath.

Bagels can be frozen for up to six months.

== Quality ==
According to a 2012 Consumer Reports article, the ideal bagel should have a slightly crispy crust, a distinct "pull" when a piece is separated from the whole by biting or pinching, a chewy inside, and the flavor of bread freshly baked. The taste may be complemented by additions cooked on the bagel, such as onion, garlic, sesame seeds, or poppy seeds. The appeal of a bagel may change upon being toasted. Toasting can have the effect of bringing or removing desirable chewiness, softening the crust, and moderating off-flavors.

Traditionally New Yorkers do not toast bagels; they argue that if a bagel is well made and fresh it should never be toasted. Some New York City bagel shops, like Murray's in Chelsea and Ess-a-Bagel at 21st and Third Avenue, have had no-toasting policies. Toasting of bagels in New York City is considered a "bastardization" and "sacrilege". Former New York Times food critic Mimi Sheraton called the practice of eating toasted bagels "obscene".

A typical bagel has 260–350 kcal (1,100–1,500 kJ), 1.0–4.5 grams of fat, 330–660 milligrams of sodium, and 2–5 grams of fiber. Gluten-free bagels have much more fat, often 9 grams, because of ingredients in the dough to supplant the wheat flour of the original.

== Varieties ==
=== New York style ===
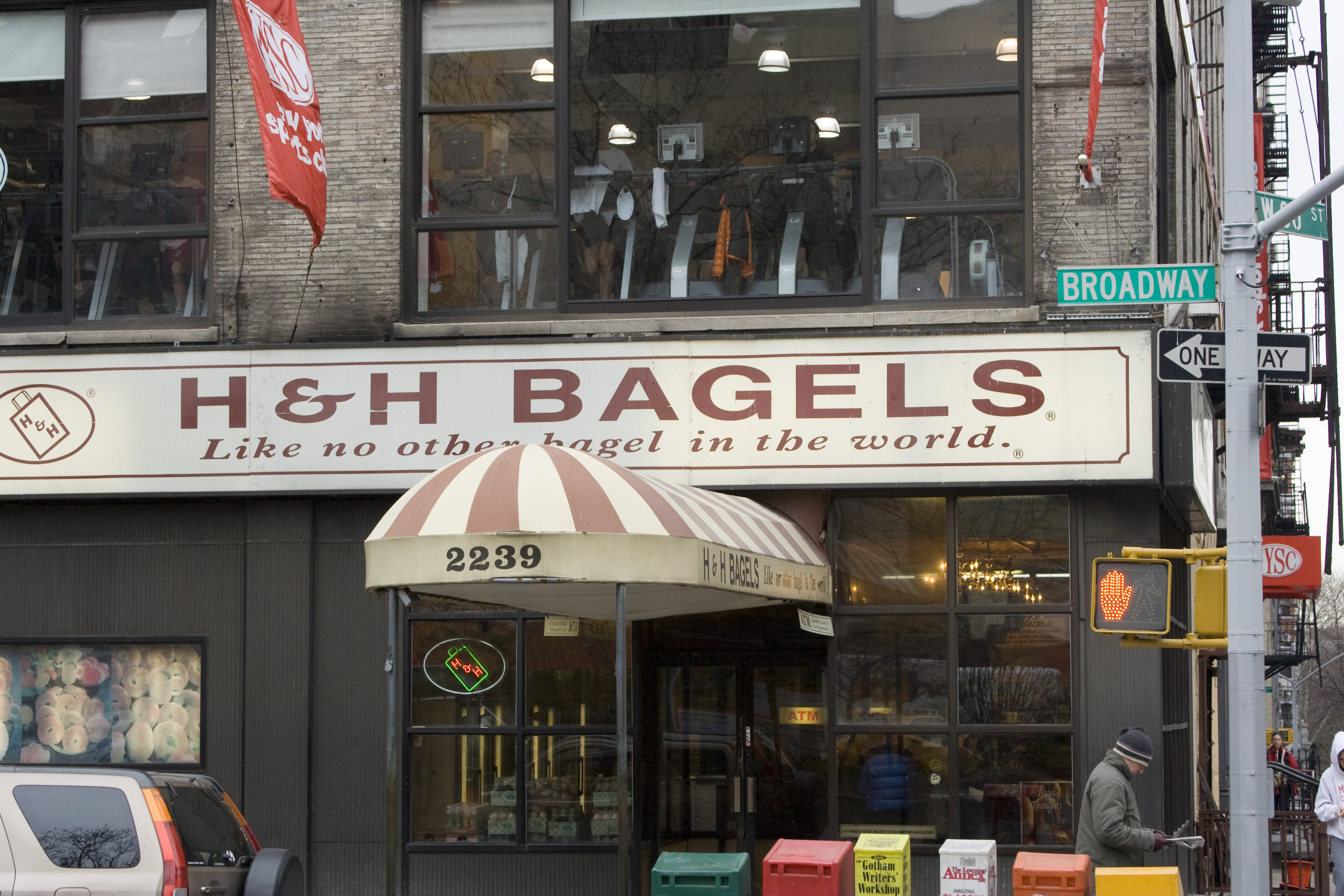
H&H Bagel, Broadway and W 80th St, New York City.

The New York bagel contains malt, is cold-fermented for several days to develop the flavors and enhance the crust, and is boiled in salted water before baking in a standard oven. The resulting bagel has a fluffy interior and a chewy crust. According to CNN, Brooklynites believe New York bagels are the best due to the quality of the local water. According to Brooklyn Water Bagels CEO Steven Fassberg, the characteristics of a New York bagel are the result of the recipe formula and preparation method.

=== Montreal style ===
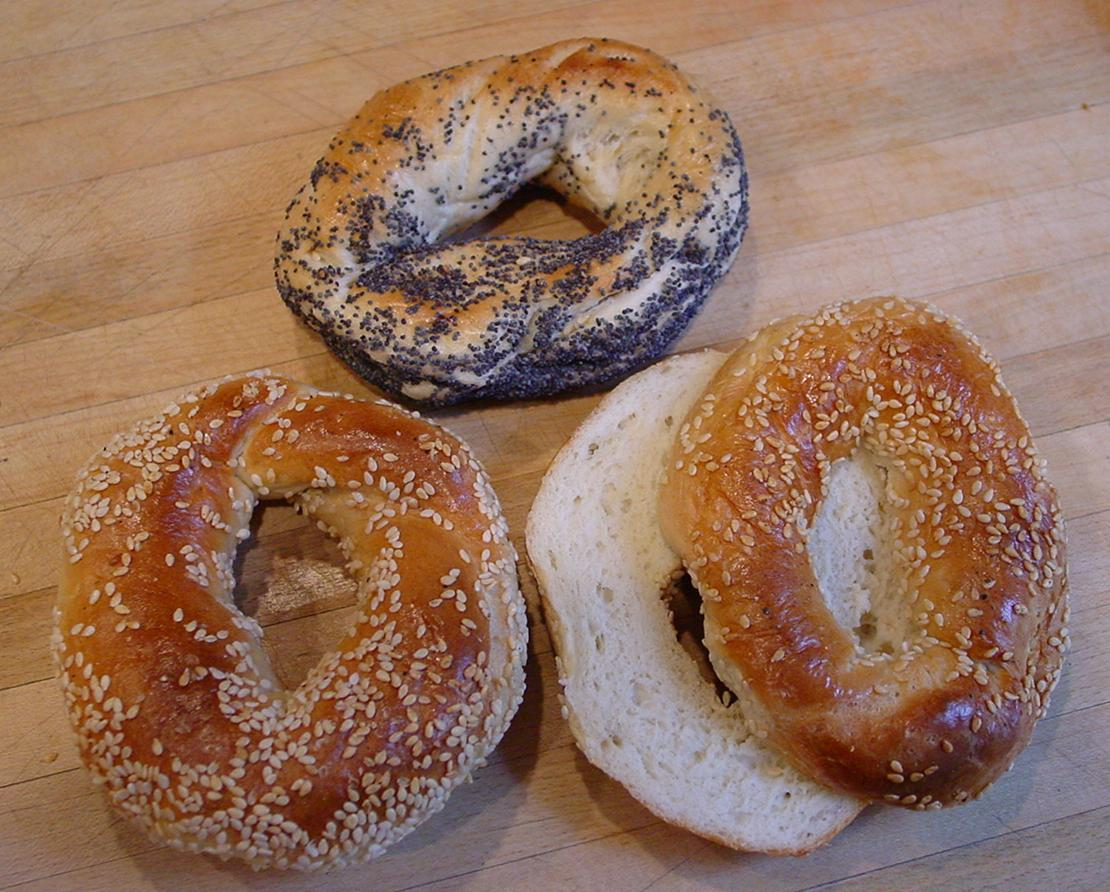
Three Montreal-style bagels: one poppy and two sesame bagels

Different from the New York style, the Montreal-style bagel contains malt and sugar with no salt; it is boiled in honey-sweetened water before baking in a wood-fired oven. It is predominantly of the sesame "white" seeds variety (bagels in Toronto are similar to those made in New York in that they are less sweet, generally are coated with poppy seeds and are baked in a standard oven).

=== St. Louis style ===
The St. Louis style bagel refers not to composition, but to a particular method of slicing the bagel. The St. Louis style bagels are sliced vertically multiple times, instead of the traditional single horizontal slice. The slices range from 3 to 6 mm (0.12 to 0.24 in) thick. This style of bagel was popularized by the St. Louis Bread Company, now known as Panera Bread. Generally, the bagels are sliced into eight pieces using a bread slicer, which produces characteristically precise cuts (the bagel is not torn or crushed while slicing). This particular method of preparation increases the surface area available for spreads (e.g., cream cheese, butter). However, it decreases the portability of the bagel and prevents formation of sandwiches.

=== Other bagel styles ===
Other bagel styles can be found elsewhere; Chicago-style bagels are baked with steam. American chef John Mitzewich has a recipe for what he calls San Francisco-style bagels which yields bagels flatter than New York-style bagels, characterized by a rough-textured crust. The traditional London bagel (or beigel as it is sometimes spelled and pronounced) is sweeter, chewier and has a denser texture.

In Austria, beigl (often also spelled beigerl or beugerl in its diminutive form) are a traditional Lenten food. The rings are made from a yeasted dough, rolled out very thin and briefly boiled in salted water before topped with salt and caraway seeds and then baked. Depending on the region, they are sometimes baked to a very hard consistency, making them relatively brittle. Connected with it is the tradition of Beiglreißen (lit. 'ripping/tearing the beigl') at Easter where two people pull on opposite ends of a beigl until it breaks into two pieces. Tearing off the larger piece is meant to bring good luck. In Vienna, Eastern Lower Austria and Burgenland, beugerl has taken on the meaning of certain types of kipferl.

== Non-traditional doughs and types ==
While normally and traditionally made of yeasted wheat, in the late 20th century variations on the bagel flourished. Non-traditional versions that change the dough recipe include pumpernickel, rye, sourdough, bran, whole wheat, and multigrain. Other variations change the flavor of the dough, often using blueberry, salt, onion, garlic, egg, cinnamon, raisin, chocolate chip, cheese, or some combination of the above. Green bagels are sometimes created for St. Patrick's Day.

A flat bagel, known as a 'flagel', can be found in a few locations in and around New York City, Long Island, and Toronto. According to a review attributed to New York's Village Voice food critic Robert Seitsema, the flagel was first created by Brooklyn's 'Tasty Bagels' deli in the early 1990s.

== Large scale commercial sales ==
=== United States supermarket sales ===
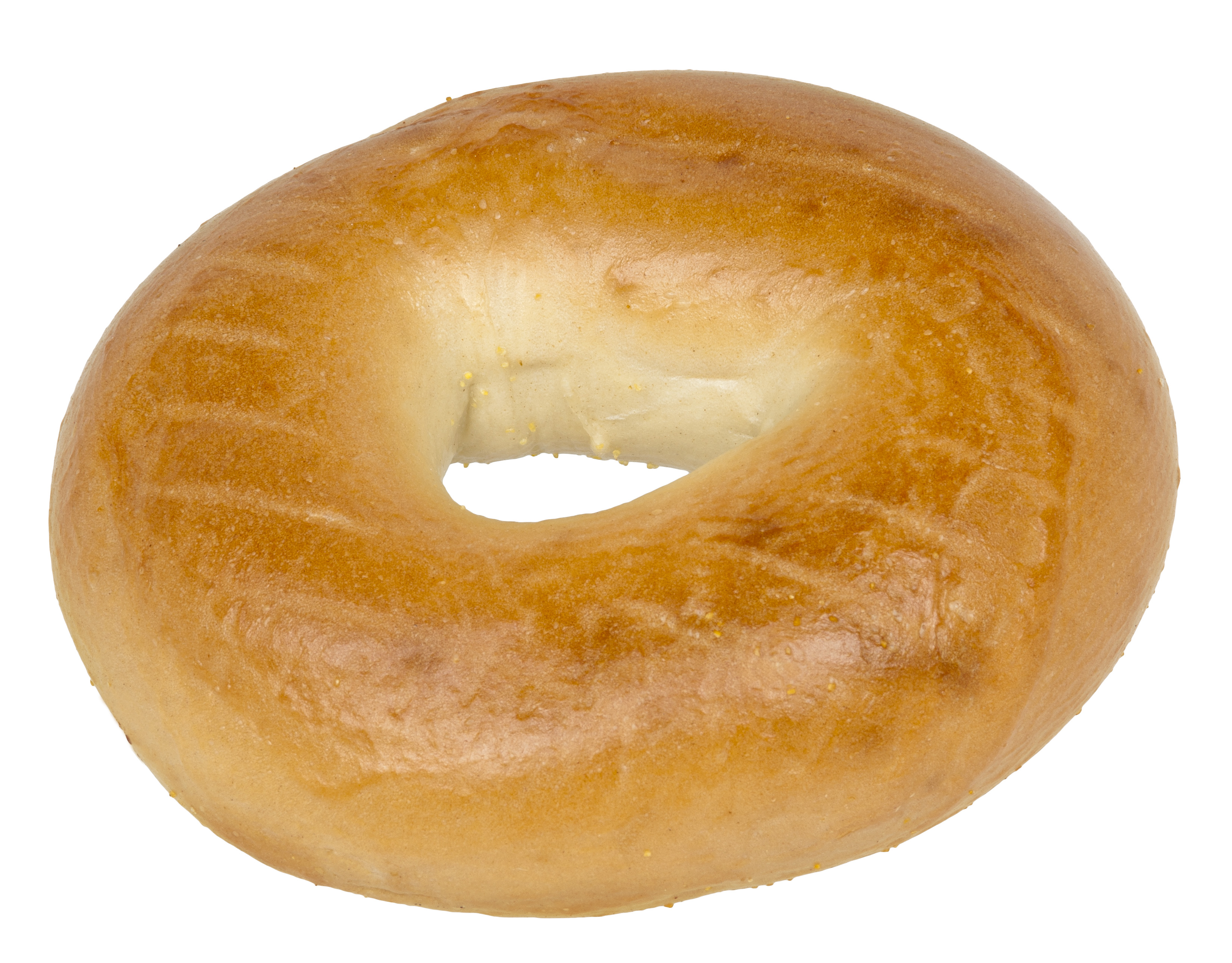
Mass-produced steamed bagel purchased from a grocery store.

According to the American Institute of Baking (AIB), 2008 supermarket sales (52-week period ending January 27, 2009) of the top eight leading commercial fresh (not frozen) bagel brands in the United States:

- totaled to US$430,185,378 based on 142,669,901 package unit sales.
- the top eight leading brand names for the above were (by order of sales): Thomas', Sara Lee, private label brands, Pepperidge Farm, Thomas Mini Squares, Lender's Bagels (Pinnacle Foods), Weight Watchers and The Alternative Bagel (Western Bagel).

Further, AIB-provided statistics for the 52-week period ending May 18, 2008, for refrigerated/frozen supermarket bagel sales for the top 10 brand names totaled US$50,737,860, based on 36,719,977 unit package sales.

The AIB reported US$626.9 million fresh bagel US supermarket sales (excluding Wal-Mart) for the 52 weeks ending 11 April 2012. Fresh/frozen supermarket sales (excluding Wal-Mart) for the 52 weeks ending 13 May 2012 was US$592.7 million. The average price for a bag of fresh bagels was $3.27; for frozen it was $1.23.

== Similar breads ==
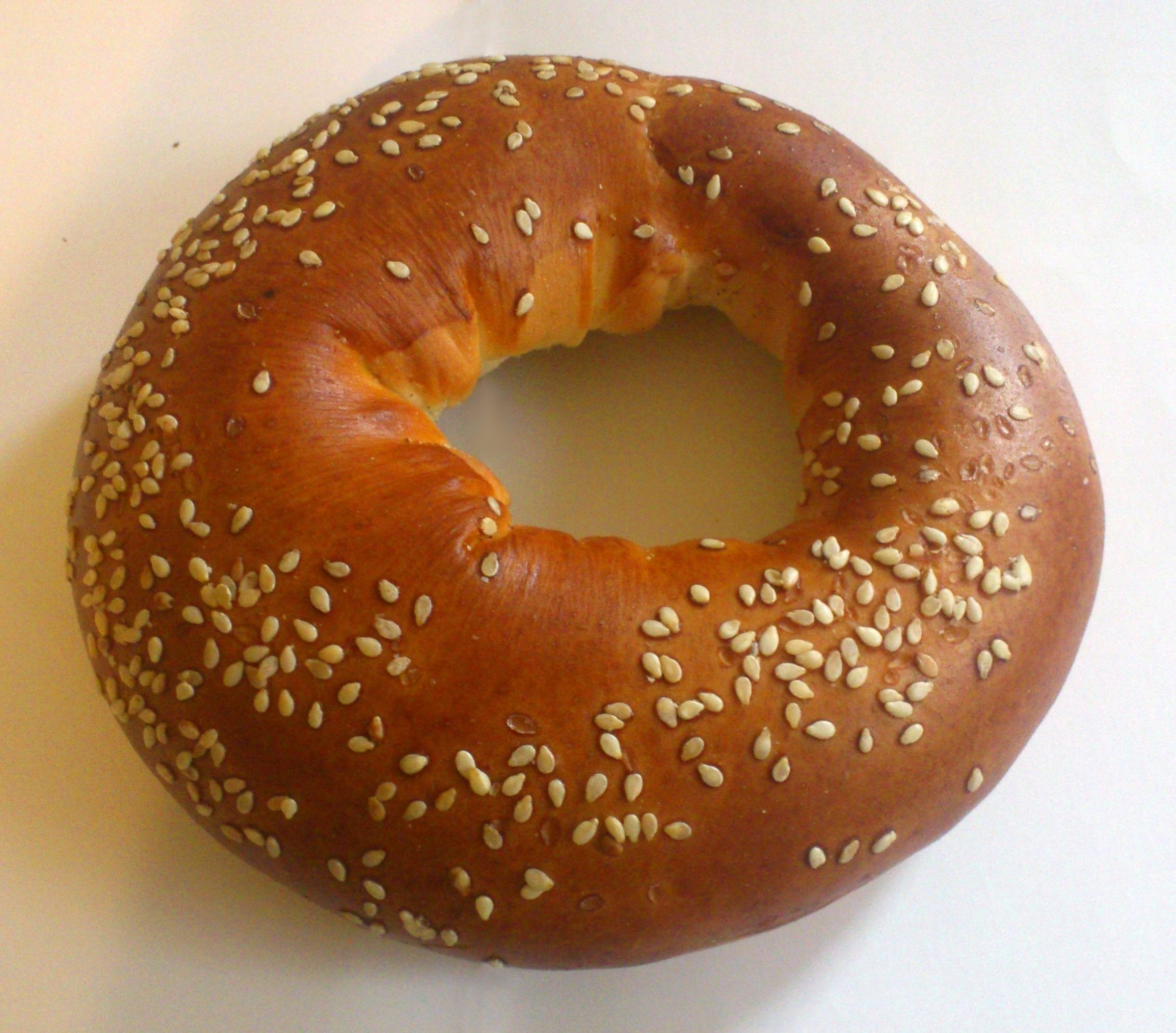
Ukrainian bublik

Many cultures developed similar breads and preparations, such as bubliki in Russia, Ukraine and Belarus, and obwarzanek (in particular obwarzanek krakowski) in Poland. Somewhat similar in appearance to bagels, these breads are usually topped with sesame and poppy seeds. The ingredients in these breads and bagels somewhat differ, as these breads are made with a different dough using butter, and sometimes also with milk.

In Italy, taralli and friselle are breads similar to bagels.

In Turkey, a salty and fattier form is called açma. The ring-shaped simit is sometimes marketed today as a Turkish bagel. Archival sources show that the simit has been produced in Istanbul since 1525. Based on Üsküdar court records (Şer’iyye Sicili) dated 1593, the weight and price of simit was standardized for the first time. Noted 17th-century traveler Evliya Çelebi wrote that there were 70 simit bakeries in Istanbul during the 1630s.

Jean Brindesi's early 19th-century oil paintings about Istanbul daily life show simit sellers on the streets. Warwick Goble made an illustration of the simit sellers of Istanbul in 1906. Simit is very similar to the twisted sesame-sprinkled bagels pictured being sold in early 20th century Poland. Simit are also sold on the street in baskets or carts, as bagels were then.

The Uyghurs of Xinjiang, China enjoy girdeh nan (from Persian, meaning round bread), a type of nan, the local bread.

Another bagel-like type of bread is the traditional German Dortmunder Salzkuchen from the 19th century.

Ka'ak al-Quds (better known in English as the Jerusalem bagel) is an oblong ring bread, usually topped with sesame seeds, with its origins in Jerusalem. Unlike the bagel, it is not boiled prior to baking.

== Cultural references ==
"Bagel" is also a Yeshivish term for sleeping 12 hours straight—e.g., "I slept a bagel last night." There are various opinions as to the origins of this term. It may be a reference to the fact that bagel dough has to "rest" for at least 12 hours between mixing and baking.

In tennis, a "bagel" refers to a player winning a set 6–0; winning a match 6–0, 6–0, 6–0 is called a "triple bagel".

The term "bageling" refers to when a Jew uses a Jewish word or phrase in a conversation, or in the vicinity of a stranger who is also clearly Jewish, in order to inform them that they are also Jewish.

The bagel is a major plot device in the 2022 science-fiction film Everything Everywhere All at Once.

== See also ==
- Appetizing store
- Bagel and cream cheese
- Bialy (bread)
- Doughnut
- Jewish cuisine
- Pizza bagel
- Pletzel
- Simit
