= Picturesque Russia =

Russian historical book series

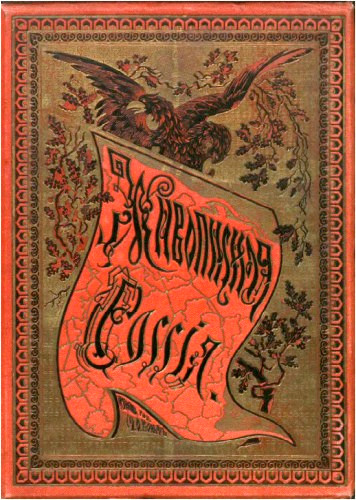
- Edition cover design
- Original title: Живописная Россия
- Country: Russia
- Language: Russian
- Publisher: M. O. Wolff's Partnership
- Published: 1881 - 1901
- No. of books: 19

Picturesque Russia (Russian: Живописная Россия, romanized: Zhivopisnaya Rossiya; also Picturesque Russia: Our fatherland in its land, historical, tribal, economic and everyday meaning) is a Russian 19-volume edition prepared by the M. O. Wolff's Partnership in the 1870s and published in 1881–1901. It is one of the most expensive publications in the history of Russian book printing.

The edition consists of 19 books with 6984 pages in total and containing 220 individual essays written by 93 writers and illustrated with 3815 drawings. In total, 423 people participated in the preparation of the publication.

At the beginning of the 21st century, an attempt was made to reprint the book.

== History ==
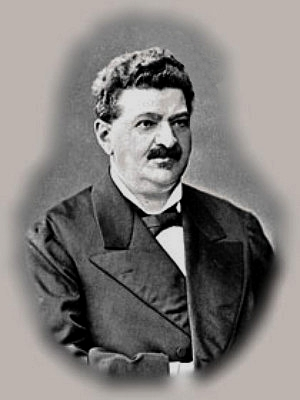
Maurycy Wolff, head of the M. O. Wolff's Partnership, that had elaborated Picturesque Russia

The idea of publishing a large work, which includes a detailed, comprehensive artistic and scientific description of the Russian Empire and the peoples inhabiting it, appeared to Maurycy Wolff a long time ago. But, due to the huge risk of significant costs and the difficulty of finding writers, scientists, and artists suitable for the implementation of the very idea, he did not dare to start implementing his plan for a long time.

The core or cell of Picturesque Russia was conceived at the beginning of publishing, in 1856, an illustrated description of Poland, edited by the famous Polish writer Józef Kraszewski, but for political reasons it was not implemented.

In addition to journals, Wolff published large illustrated and scientific publications by subscription. The best scientific and literary forces were invited to participate in this edition.

== See also ==
- State Public Historical Library of Russia

== Bibliography ==
- Букинистическая торговля: Учебник для студентов вузов / под ред. А. А. Говорова и А. В. Дорошевич. — М. Изд-во МПИ, 1990.
- Белов С. В., Толстяков А. П. Русские издатели конца XIX — начала XX века. — Л.: Наука, 1976.
- Иллюстрированный каталог книг книгопродавца-издателя М. О. Вольфа. 2000 изящных и полезных книг. — СПб: Вольф, 1882.
- Книговедение: Энциклопедический словарь. — М.: Советская энциклопедия, 1981.
- Коломнин П. П. Краткие сведения по типографскому делу. — СПб., 1899.
- Либрович С. Ф. Кабинетная библиотека. Критико-библиографическое руководство при выборе книг по журнальным рецензиям, критикам, отзывам специалистов и т. п. — СПб: Вольф, 1884.
- Либрович С. Ф. На книжном посту. Воспоминания. Записки. Документы. — Пг.; М.: Вольф, 1916.
- Полный каталог изданий тов-ва М. О. Вольф 1853–1905. — СПб.; М., 1905.
- О. Л. Тараканова. Антикварная книга: Учебник для вузов. — М., 1996.
