= Obwarzanek krakowski =

Early ring-shaped bread product

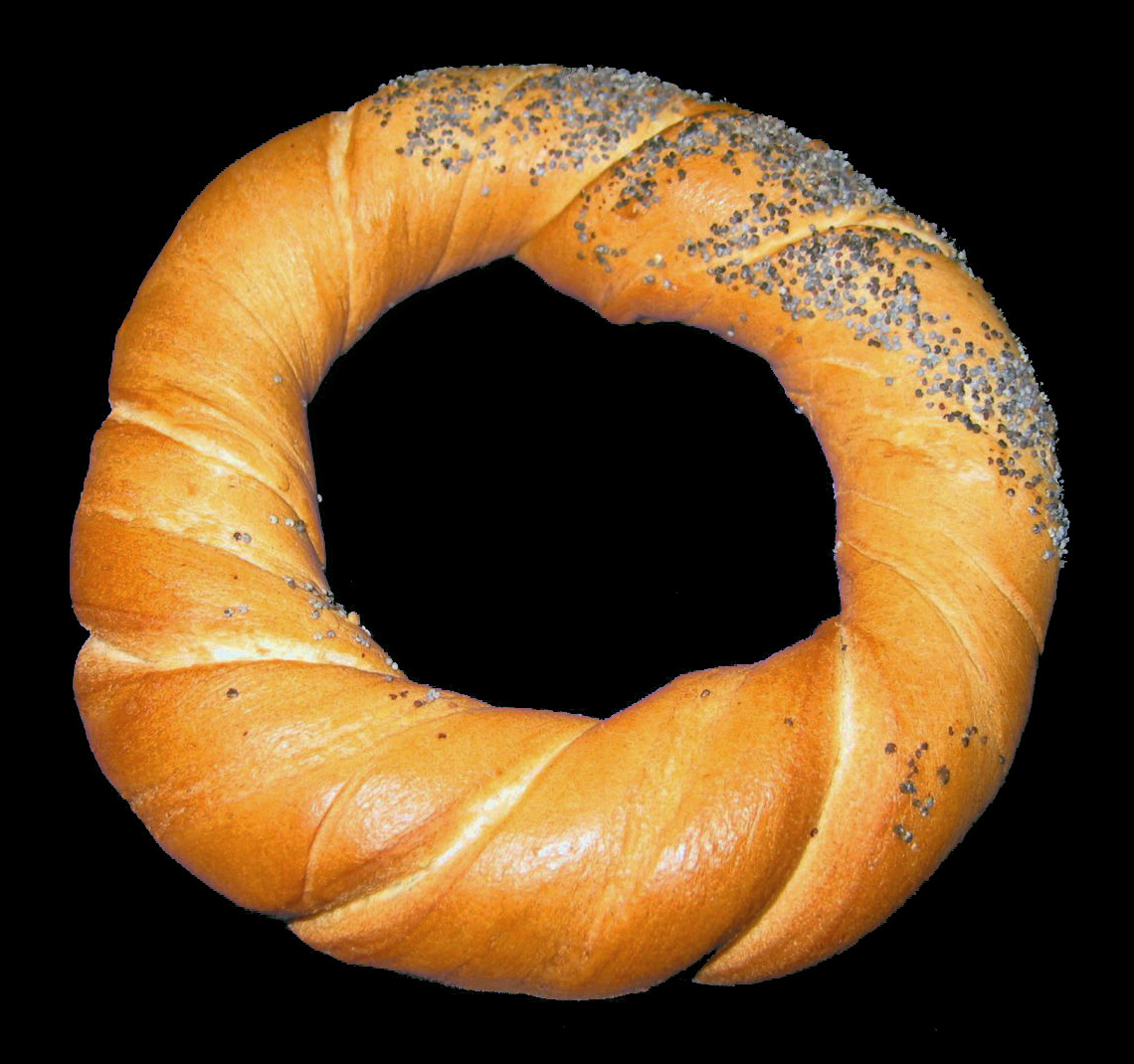
- An obwarzanek krakowski sprinkled with poppy seeds
- Type: Street food
- Region or state: Kraków, Poland
- Associated cuisine: Polish
- Serving temperature: Room temperature
- Main ingredients: Wheat flour, fat (usually lard), yeast, sugar, salt
- Ingredients generally used: Coarse salt, poppy seeds, sesame seeds (for sprinkling)
- Variations: Depend on the sprinkling
- Similar dishes: Bagel, bublik, pretzel

An obwarzanek krakowski (Polish pronunciation: [ɔbvaˈʐanɛk kraˈkɔfskʲi], plural: obwarzanki krakowskie [ɔbvaˈʐaŋkʲi kraˈkɔfskʲɛ]; also spelled obarzanek) is a braided ring-shaped bread that is boiled and sprinkled with salt and sesame or poppy seeds before being baked. It has a white, sweetish, moist and chewy crumb underneath a crunchy golden-brown crust. Traditionally sold from street carts, it is a popular snack in the Polish city of Kraków, where it has the status of a regional food with protected geographical indication. It is closely related to, but distinct from, bagels, bubliks and pretzels.

== Etymology ==
The term obwarzanek krakowski is Polish. The Polish noun obwarzanek, or obarzanek, derives from the verb obwarzać, "to parboil", which refers to the distinctive technique of boiling the dough before baking. The adjective krakowski denotes anything coming from or related to the city of Kraków.

== Description ==
An obwarzanek krakowski is a ring-shaped baked product with a hole in the middle. It takes the form of an oval or, seldom, a circle. Its surface is formed by strands of dough, round or oval in cross-section, twisted into a spiral. The colour ranges from light golden to light brown, with a distinct sheen. A typical obwarzanek is 12–17 centimetres (5–7 in) in diameter, 2–4 cm (0.8–1.6 in) thick, and weighs 80–120 grams (3–4 oz).

The visible strands of the spiral on the crust are firmish to the touch and the surface varies from smooth to slightly rough. The crumb inside is pale, soft and slightly moist. The taste is sweetish, which is typical of bakery products that are first parboiled and then baked. Obwarzanki are traditionally decorated by sprinkling them with various ingredients, including coarse salt, poppy seeds, sesame seeds, flax seeds, nigella seeds, mixed herbs or mixed spices (paprika, caraway, pepper), grated cheese, onion flakes, etc.

== History ==
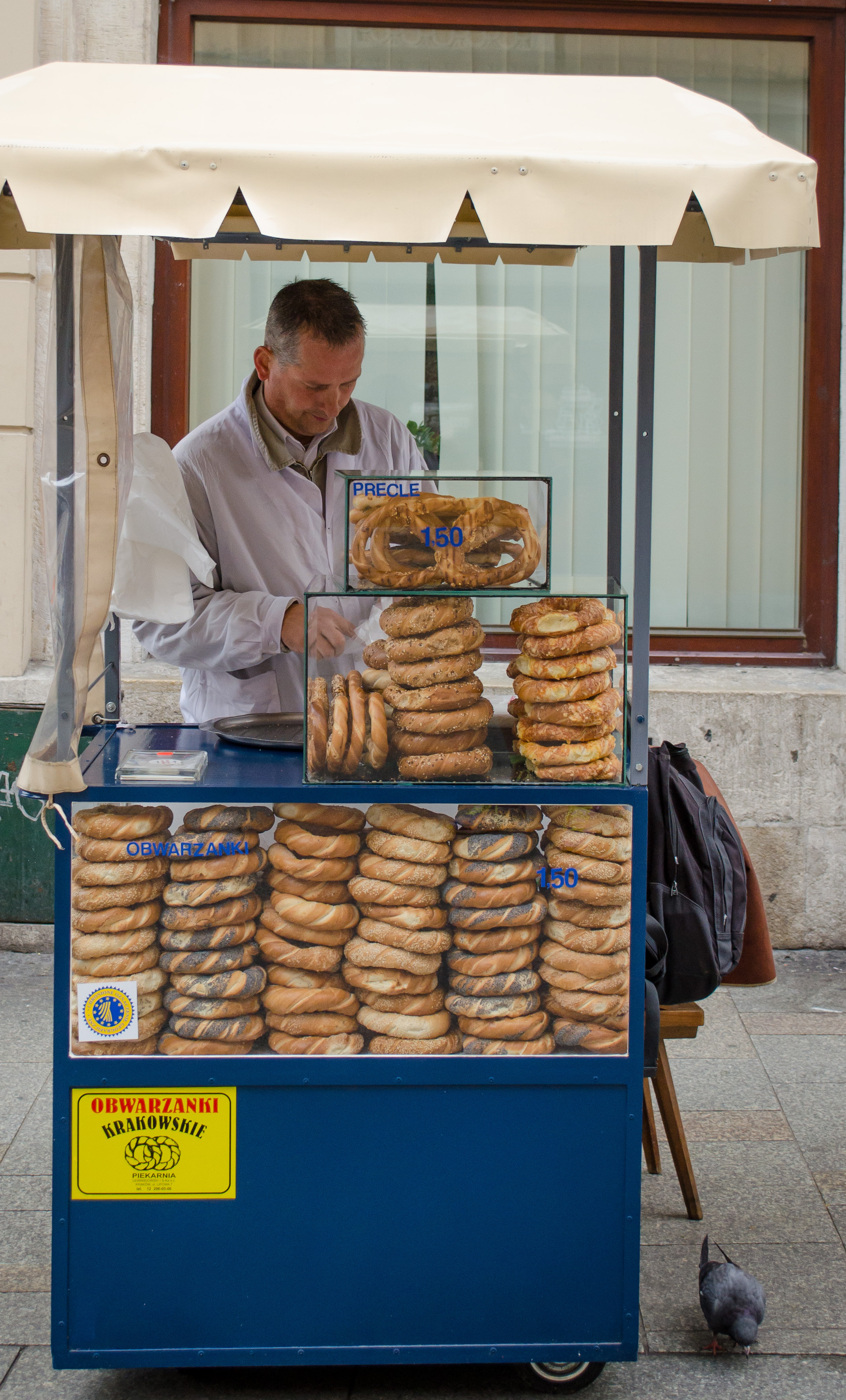
A street vendor in Kraków selling obwarzanki and pretzels from a typical cart

The earliest known references to obwarzanki being baked in Kraków, Poland's former royal capital, appear in the accounts of the court of Queen Jadwiga and her consort King Vladislaus II Jagiełło. An entry dated to 2 March 1394 mentions the product using both its Polish name and its equivalent in Polish Medieval Latin, circuli, or "rings": "for the queen, for rings of obwarzanki [pro circulis obarzankij], 1 grosz".

In 1496, King John Albert granted the bakers' guild of the city of Kraków a monopoly on baking white bread, including obwarzanki. This privilege was subsequently confirmed by all Polish kings up to John III Sobieski. Initially, obwarzanki could be made only during Lent by bakers specially designated for that purpose by the guild. The guild issued a decree in 1611 regulating the sale of obwarzanki inside the city walls and the choice of bakers who were allowed to sell them.

A radical change took place in the 19th century. On 22 January 1802, a decree was signed which stipulated that any baker had the right to bake obwarzanki when it was his turn to do so. The bakers authorised to bake obwarzanki were selected by the drawing of lots. The custom of drawing lots probably ended in 1849, there being no evidence that it continued after that date. This could mean that, over time, the rules were relaxed and any baker could make obwarzanki on any day of the year, as is still the case today.

Obwarzanek krakowski (protected geographical indication) may be produced only in the city of Kraków and the adjacent Kraków and Wieliczka counties.

Obwarzanki were sold from stalls which opened before 6 a.m. so that the inhabitants of Kraków could buy them freshly baked early in the morning. The guild monitored the quality and freshness of the products, eight of its members being responsible for carrying out checks on stalls. Any transgressions were severely punished. Eventually, people started selling obwarzanki in other ways. As late as the 1950s, they were sold straight from wicker baskets.

In modern times, obwarzanki have been sold not only in shops and bakeries, but also from street carts. There are between 170 and 180 such carts offering obwarzanki in Kraków today. An average of almost 150,000 are sold on the Kraków market in a single day.

The obwarzanek krakowski often features in campaigns to promote Kraków. As a well-known symbol of Kraków and Lesser Poland, it is often used in advertising aimed at locals and tourists alike. It has also won an award at the Nasze Kulinarne Dziedzictwo (Our Culinary Heritage) competition, and received a prize at the 2003 Polagra Farm international fair in Poznań. It always features at the Święto Chleba bread festival, an event that is held regularly in Kraków.

== See also ==
- List of breads

== Sources ==
- "obwarzanek". Słownik języka polskiego PWN. Wydawnictwo Naukowe PWN.
- Balinska, Maria (2008). The Bagel: The Surprising History of a Modest Bread. New Haven and London: Yale University Press. ISBN 978-0-300-11229-0.
- Council Regulation (EC) 510/2006, "Obwarzanek krakowski" EC No. PL-PGI-005-0674. 16 February 2010.
- Dembińska, Maria (1999). Weaver, William Woys (ed.). Food and Drink in Medieval Poland: Rediscovering a Cuisine of the Past. Philadelphia: University of Pennsylvania Press. ISBN 0-8122-3224-0.
- Przezdziecki, Alexander (1854). "Życie domowe Jadwigi i Jagiełły: z regestrów skarbowych z lat 1388–1417" [Private Life of Hedwig and Jagiełło: From Treasury Registers of 1388–1417]. Biblioteka Warszawska (in Polish). 2. Warszawa: Drukarnia Stanisława Strąbskiego: 299–320.
