= Delight =

Delight may refer to:

== Music ==
- Delight (band), a Polish metal band
- Delight (album) or the title song, by Rina Aiuchi, 2006
- Delight (Baekhyun EP), 2020
- Delight (D-Lite EP), 2014
- "Delight", a song by 2 Unlimited from Get Ready!, 1992
- "Delight", a song by Bic Runga from Drive, 1997

== People ==
- Delight Evans (1902–ca. 1985), American entertainment writer, editor, and film critic
- John Delight (1925–2013), British clergyman

== Places ==
- Delight, Arkansas, US
- Delight Township, Custer County, Nebraska, US

== Ships ==
- English ship Delight (1583), a sailing ship that ran aground while on Sir Humphrey Gilbert's expedition to Newfoundland
- HMS Delight, thirteen ships of the Royal Navy
- MV Delight, a ship hijacked November 2008 by Somali pirates
- Delight, a ship commanded by the British pirate Francis Spriggs 1724–1725

== Other uses ==
- Delight, a 2013 film by Welsh director Gareth Jones
- Premier Padmini or Fiat 1100 Delight, an automobile manufactured in India 1964–2000

== See also ==
- 3Delight, 3D computer graphics software
- D-Lite or Daesung (born 1989), South Korean singer and actor
- Deee-Lite, a 1990s American house music group
- Afternoon Delight (disambiguation)
- Idiot's Delight (disambiguation)
- Turkish Delight (disambiguation)
