= Lokum (disambiguation) =

Lokum, also known as Turkish delight, is a family of confections based on a gel of starch and sugar.

Lokum may also refer to:

- Nokul, a type of pastry eaten in Turkey and Bulgaria
- The Danish word for toilet

== See also ==
- Turkish Delight (disambiguation)
- Locum
