= Walnut roll =

Walnut roll may refer to:

- Nut roll
- Poppy seed roll
