= Povitica =

Rolled sweet nut bread in the Croatian tradition

- Type: Sweet bread, nut roll
- Course: Dessert
- Place of origin: Central Europe
- Region or state: Croatia; Croatian-American communities, notably Kansas City, Kansas
- Main ingredients: Enriched yeast dough, ground walnuts, sugar, butter
- Variations: Poppy seed, cream cheese, apple cinnamon

Povitica is a rolled sweet bread in the Croatian tradition: an enriched yeast dough stretched very thin, spread with a ground-walnut filling, and rolled into a loaf that shows a spiral pattern when sliced. The name derives from the South Slavic verb poviti, "to wrap"; it is the older form of the same word that contracted in Slovene to potica, and the two pastries are closely related. It is traditionally baked for Christmas, Easter, and family celebrations.

== In the United States ==
Croatian immigrants carried povitica to the United States in the late 19th and early 20th centuries. The best-documented tradition is in the Strawberry Hill neighborhood of Kansas City, Kansas, settled by Croatian families in the early 1900s, where povitica was baked for holidays and given to friends, family, and community members. The tradition was commercialized in 1984, when Harley O'Leary founded the Strawberry Hill Baking Company using his family's recipe; the bakery, now operated by a fourth generation of the family in Merriam, Kansas, ships povitica nationally. Povitica traditions are also maintained in other historically South Slavic communities, including the mining towns of Butte and Anaconda, Montana.

== Preparation ==
The dough is enriched with milk, butter, and eggs, then rolled or hand-stretched until very thin — traditionally over a floured cloth, to the point of translucency — before being spread with a filling of ground walnuts, sugar, butter, and milk or cream. It is rolled tightly, proofed, and baked in a loaf pan; the thin layering produces the dense, many-turned spiral interior that distinguishes the bread.

== In popular culture ==
Povitica appeared as a technical challenge on series 5 of The Great British Bake Off in 2014.

== See also ==
- Potica
- Nut roll
- Babka
