= Nokul =

Type of puff pastry

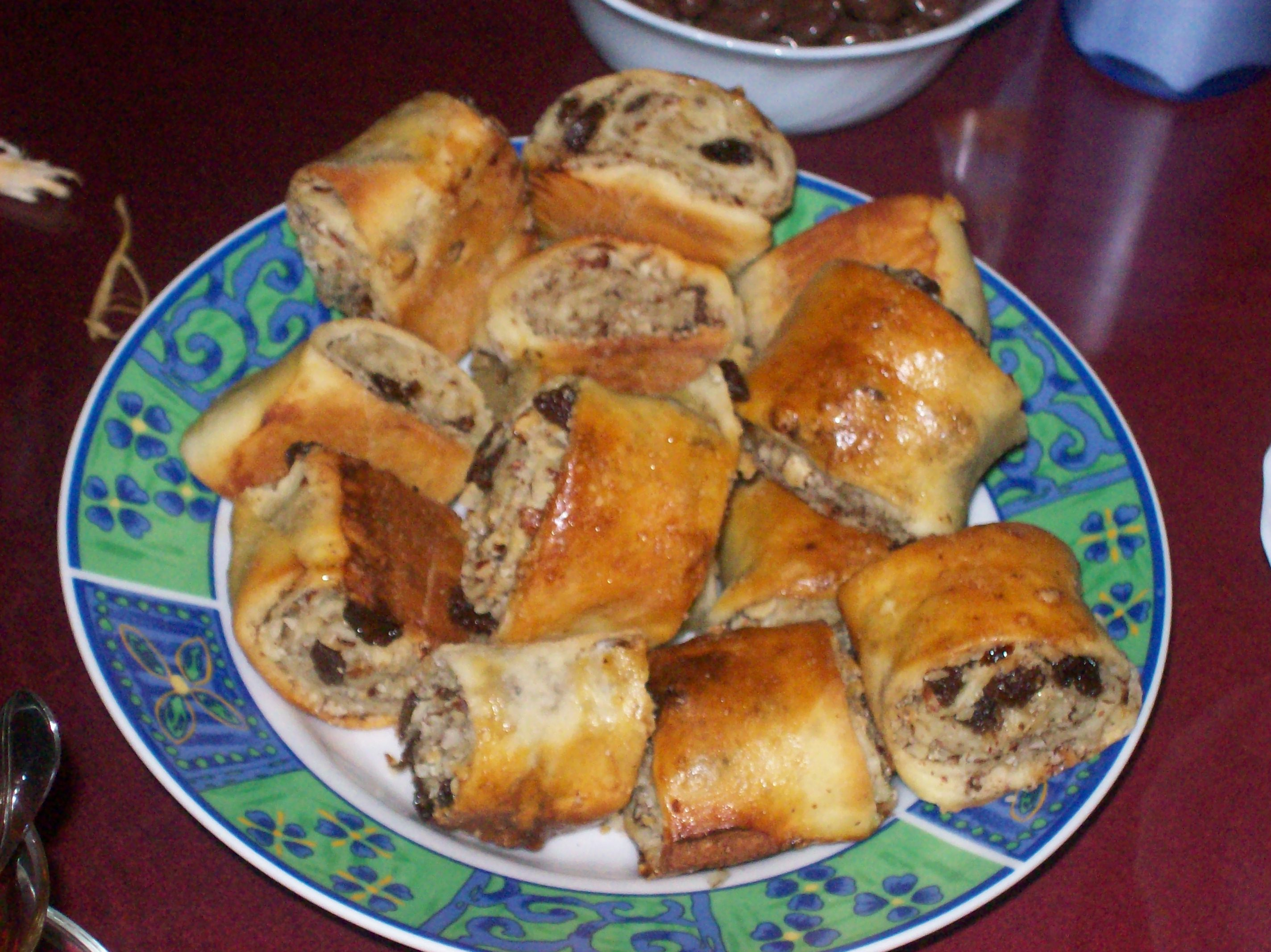
- Nokul
- Alternative names: Lokul
- Course: Main course
- Place of origin: Turkey, Bulgaria, the Levant
- Serving temperature: Hot
- Main ingredients: Walnuts, poppy seeds, beyaz peynir
- Variations: Cevizli nokul, haşhaşlı nokul, peynirli nokul, tahinli nokul, damla sakızlı tahinli nokul, fındıklı nokul

Nokul or lokul is a type of puff pastry in Turkish cuisine. It is common in the Central Black Sea Region of Turkey and the Turkish-minority areas of Bulgaria with variations. Nokul is sometimes served hot as an appetizer instead of bread. It consists of a rolled sheet of yeast dough onto which feta-style white cheese, walnut or poppy seed is sprinkled over a thin coat of butter. The dough is then rolled, cut into individual portions, and baked.

== Variations ==
- Nokul with peynir (peynirli nokul)
- Nokul with beef (etli nokul)
- Nokul with tahin (tahinli nokul)
- Nokul with walnut (cevizli nokul)
- Nokul with poppy seed (haşhaşlı nokul)
- Nokul with hazelnut (fındıklı nokul)

== Regional nokul styles ==
- Samsun nokulu
- Isparta nokulu
- Bursa walnut lokum
- Sinop nokulu

== See also ==
- Bejgli
- Cantiq
- Cozonac
- Lokma
- Nazook
- Nut roll
- Pogaca
- Poppy seed roll
- Tsoureki
