= Afternoon Delight (disambiguation) =

"Afternoon Delight" is a 1976 song by Starland Vocal Band.

Afternoon Delight may also refer to:

- Afternoon Delight (Arrested Development), an episode of Arrested Development
- Afternoon Delight (film), a 2013 film
- Afternoon Delight (TV series), a 1979–1983 Canadian television series

== See also ==
- The Afternoon Delights, a 1980s American vocal quartet
