= Nut roll =

Pastry

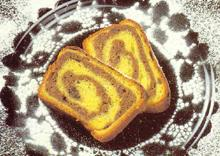
- Orahnjača variation of nut roll
- Alternative names: Many – see text
- Type: Pastry
- Place of origin: Central Europe
- Main ingredients: Sweet yeast dough, ground nuts

A nut roll is a pastry consisting of a sweet yeast dough (usually using milk) that is rolled out very thin, spread with a nut paste made from ground nuts and a sweetener like honey, then rolled up into a log shape. This 'log' is either left long and straight or is often bent into a horseshoe shape, egg-washed, baked, and then sliced crosswise. Nut rolls resemble a jelly roll (Swiss roll) but usually with more layers of dough and filling, and resemble strudels but with fewer and less delicate dough layers. Fillings commonly have as their main ingredient ground walnuts or poppy seeds.

Nut rolls can be found in the United States and in Central European cuisines. In the United States, "nut roll" is a more or less generic name for pastries of this type, no matter where they originate. Nut rolls are known also by many specific regional names, including orechovník in Slovak; makowiec in Polish; potica, povitica, gibanica, orahnjača or orehnjača in Slovenian and Serbo-Croatian (for the walnut variant; makovnjača is a variant with poppy seed, and in Croatia it can also be made with carob); kalács and bejgli in Hungarian; and pastiç (pastiche) or nokul in Turkish.

Regional variations on nut rolls are part of weddings, for Easter and Christmas, as well as other celebrations and holidays.

== Preparation and design ==
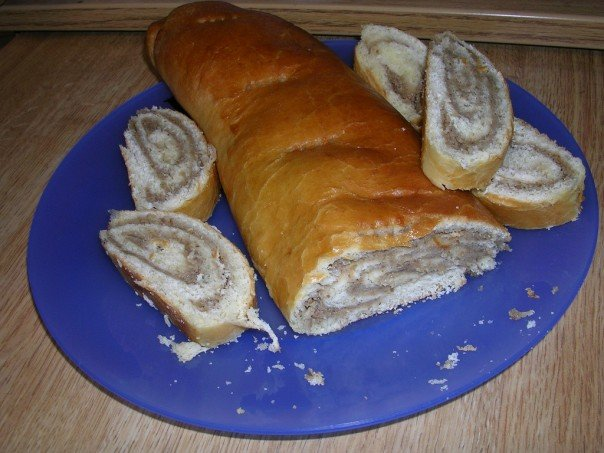
A typical American-style nut roll with a walnut and coffee filling

A sweet yeast dough is rolled flat, about 0.2 inches (5 millimeters) thick, and a filling is spread on it. The filled dough is rolled up, forming a log or loaf shape, then baked. When sliced, the cross-section shows a swirl of filling.

Types or forms of nut roll are: rolled log, loaf made via a bread pan, and a "crazy loaf" style with a unique texture. Similar ground walnut filling is used in Buchteln, a bun-shaped pastry, also with yeast dough.

== Central Europe ==
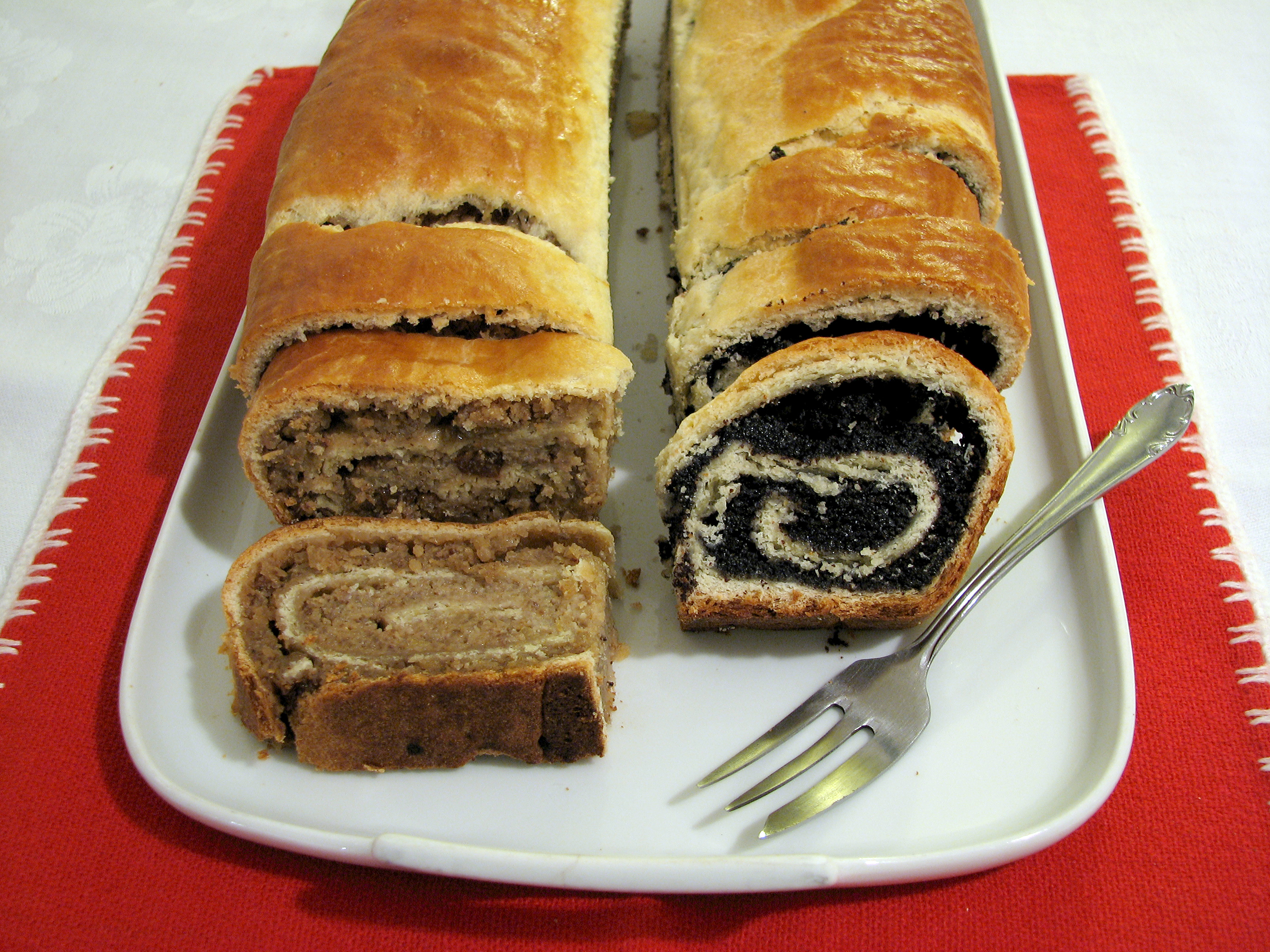
Hungarian bejgli, walnut (left) and poppy seed (right)

Traditional nut rolls in Central and Eastern Europe, like makowiec and bejgli, are a special type of rolled log shape. These are generally made with either of two types of filling: walnut and poppy seed. In addition to ground nut fillings, cinnamon, raisins or currants, different types of chopped nuts, carob, bread crumbs, lemon or orange zest, rum, butter and heavy cream or sour cream are used.

=== Croatia ===
The povitica, a traditional Croatian and partly Slovenian pastry, is made from buttery pastry dough rolled into very thin layers and covered with a layer of brown sugar, spices, and walnuts. The log-shaped loaf is then baked. Povitica was featured as the technical challenge recipe on the "Advanced Dough" episode of The Great British Baking Show in 2014. Other roll-shaped European pastries are filled with thick jam (called lekvar, usually apricot or cherry) called lekvarostekercs or Swiss roll.

=== Slovenia ===
Slovenian potica is traditional walnut roll cake in Slovenia.

=== Serbia ===
Nut roll is also typical for northern Serbia (Vojvodina), where it is named "štrudla/штрудла" or "savijača/савијача". Serbian nut roll is usually covered with a layer of poppy, walnut or cherry, but sometimes can be with a layer of carob or cocoa.

== United States ==
Nut rolls are popular across the United States, often made with some combination of walnut, poppy seed, apricot, and coffee, with more traditional varieties and preparations made in areas with large Central European settlements. They were introduced there by Central European immigrants and widely adopted by other ethnic groups in those regions. Nut rolls are an essential part of Christmas celebrations and popular other times in Pittsburgh and southwestern Pennsylvania, Austin, Texas, Joliet, Illinois, Cleveland, Ohio, Sheboygan, Wisconsin, Youngstown, Ohio, northeastern Ohio (where it is known as kolachi), the Iron Range of Minnesota, Kansas City and Butte, Montana. In Montana, povitica remains a holiday tradition in the historically South Slavic mining communities of Butte and Anaconda. In Kansas City, Kansas, the Croatian community of the Strawberry Hill neighborhood has maintained the povitica tradition since the early 1900s; it was commercialized by the Strawberry Hill Baking Company in 1984. On Minnesota's Iron Range, the Slovenian potica is counted among the region's characteristic foods.

== See also ==
- Belokranjska povitica
- Pionono
- Poppy seed roll
