= Afternoon Delight (TV program) =

Canadian television program

- Directed by: Robert Smith
- Presented by: John Donabie
- Starring: Max Haines; Earl McRae
- Country of origin: Canada
- Original language: English
- No. of seasons: 4

Production
- Producer: Cynthia Ann Grech
- Running time: 30–60 minutes

Original release
- Network: CBC Television
- Release: 30 July 1979 – 7 April 1983

Afternoon Delight is a Canadian television program on relationships between men and women that aired on CBC Television from 1979 to 1983.

== Premise ==
This was a news and information program that explored contemporary family and interpersonal relationships. Radio personality John Donabie was its host, with regular appearances from Max Haines who recounted crimes of passion and sportswriter Earl McRae who interviewed celebrity sports couples. Music was provided by a band led by Jack Lenz.

== Scheduling ==
The program aired each weekday afternoon at 3:00 p.m. (Eastern) from 30 July to 7 September 1979. After this, it became a half-hour program from 21 September 1979 until its final broadcast on 7 April 1983.
