= Idiot's Delight =

Idiot's Delight may refer to:

== Art and entertainment ==
- Idiot's Delight (play), a 1936 play by Robert E. Sherwood
- Idiot's Delight (film), a 1939 adaptation of the play, starring Clark Gable and Norma Shearer
- Idiot's Delight, a freeform radio program hosted by Vin Scelsa

== Patience or Card Solitaire ==
- Idiot's Delight, a pejorative term for any patience or card solitaire
- Idiot's Delight is also an alternative name for the following patiences or card solitaires:
  - Aces Up, a game which is playable in a minimal space
  - King Albert (solitaire), believed to be named after King Albert of Belgium
  - Perpetual Motion (solitaire), which has the object of discarding playing cards from the tableau

== See also ==
- Idiots Deluxe, a 1945 short film starring the Three Stooges
- Delight (disambiguation)
