= Potica =

Slovenian walnut cake roll

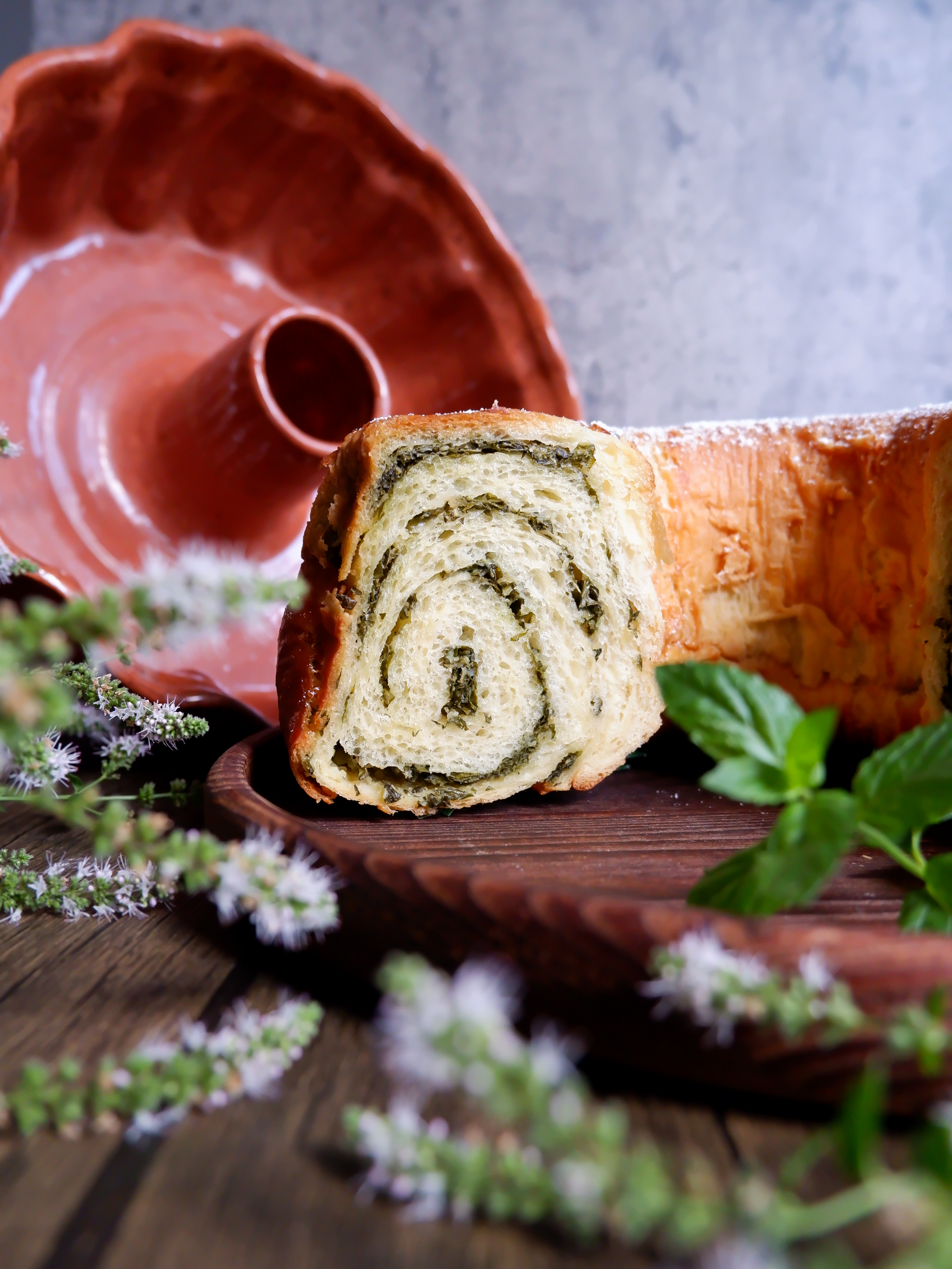
- Slovenska potica is variation of rolled pastry.
- Alternative names: Potica
- Type: Pastry
- Place of origin: Slovenia
- Region or state: all regions of Slovenia, Carinthia, Province of Trieste
- Created by: traditional folk food
- Main ingredients: Sweet yeast dough, ground walnut, butter
- Variations: tarragon, quark, hazelnut, pumpkin seed, poppy seed, cracklings, bacon

Potica (Slovene pronunciation: [pɔˈtiːt͡sa], also slovenska potica) is a traditional festive pastry from Slovenia.

The word potica as well as some regional names for potica, like povtica, potvica, etc. are descended from the word povitica. Povitica is derived from the verb 'poviti', which means to wrap in or to envelop, and it signifies a type of pastry that you roll. This type of dessert is common in many Eastern European countries as well as in regions bordering Slovenia, for example, in Friuli in neighboring Italy, they prepare a sweet bread called gubana, in Austria, a roll called Kärntner Reinling.

== History ==
The earliest written mention of the pastry appears in the works of Protestant reformer Primož Trubar in 1575 and 1577, under the older name povitica. Johann Weikhard von Valvasor provided an early detailed description of the rolled honey-and-walnut pastry in The Glory of the Duchy of Carniola (1689). In December 2021, the making of potica was entered into Slovenia's national register of intangible cultural heritage.

== Preparation ==
Potica is made from an enriched, leavened dough rolled thin, spread with filling, rolled into a log, and traditionally baked in a potičnik — a round earthenware or metal mould with a central chimney. The specification for protected "Slovenska potica" requires the potičnik, a minimum base diameter of 14 cm, and at least three to four turns of dough and filling in the finished loaf, and permits five fillings: walnut, walnut with raisins, raisin, tarragon, and tarragon with cottage cheese.

== Varieties ==
Potica consists of a rolled pastry made of leavened paper-thin dough filled with any of a great variety of fillings, but most often with walnut filling.

The most characteristic poticas are made with ground walnut, tarragon, quark, hazelnut or poppy seed, salted ones even with cracklings or bacon, and other fillings. Potica is a festive pastry and could be baked in two ways: in the oven or directly on the hearth, but original Slovenska potica is a ring-shaped pastry, baked always in the special shaped potica baking mould (ceramic, glass or tin one), called potičnik, which has a conical protrusion in the middle.

Potica is served also every Easter and Christmas in Slovenia and is still very popular even in some parts of the United States. For example, potica is a popular offering at many local bakeries in Hibbing, Minnesota based on recipes handed down for generations in the immigrant community.

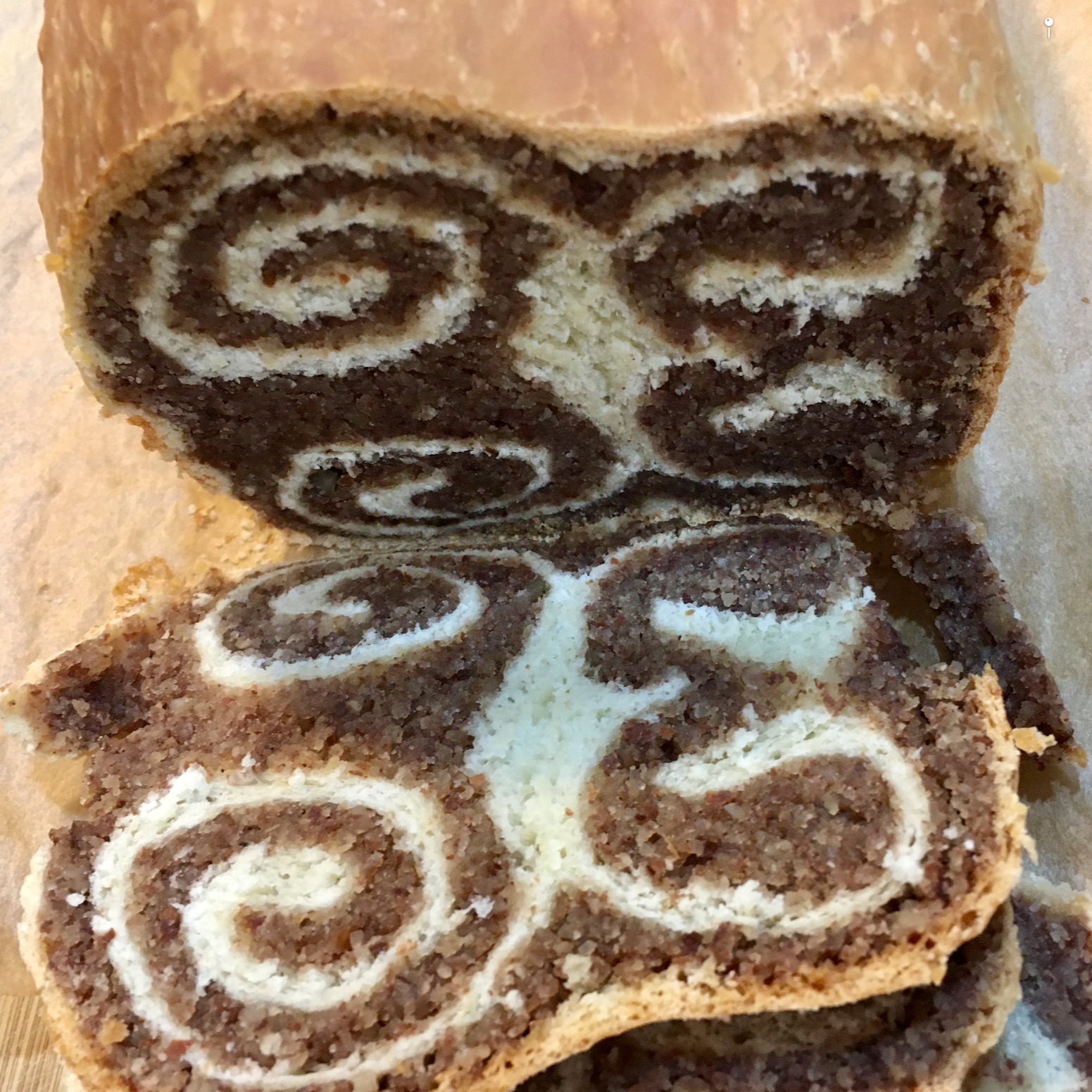
Potica made with mixed nuts and cinnamon

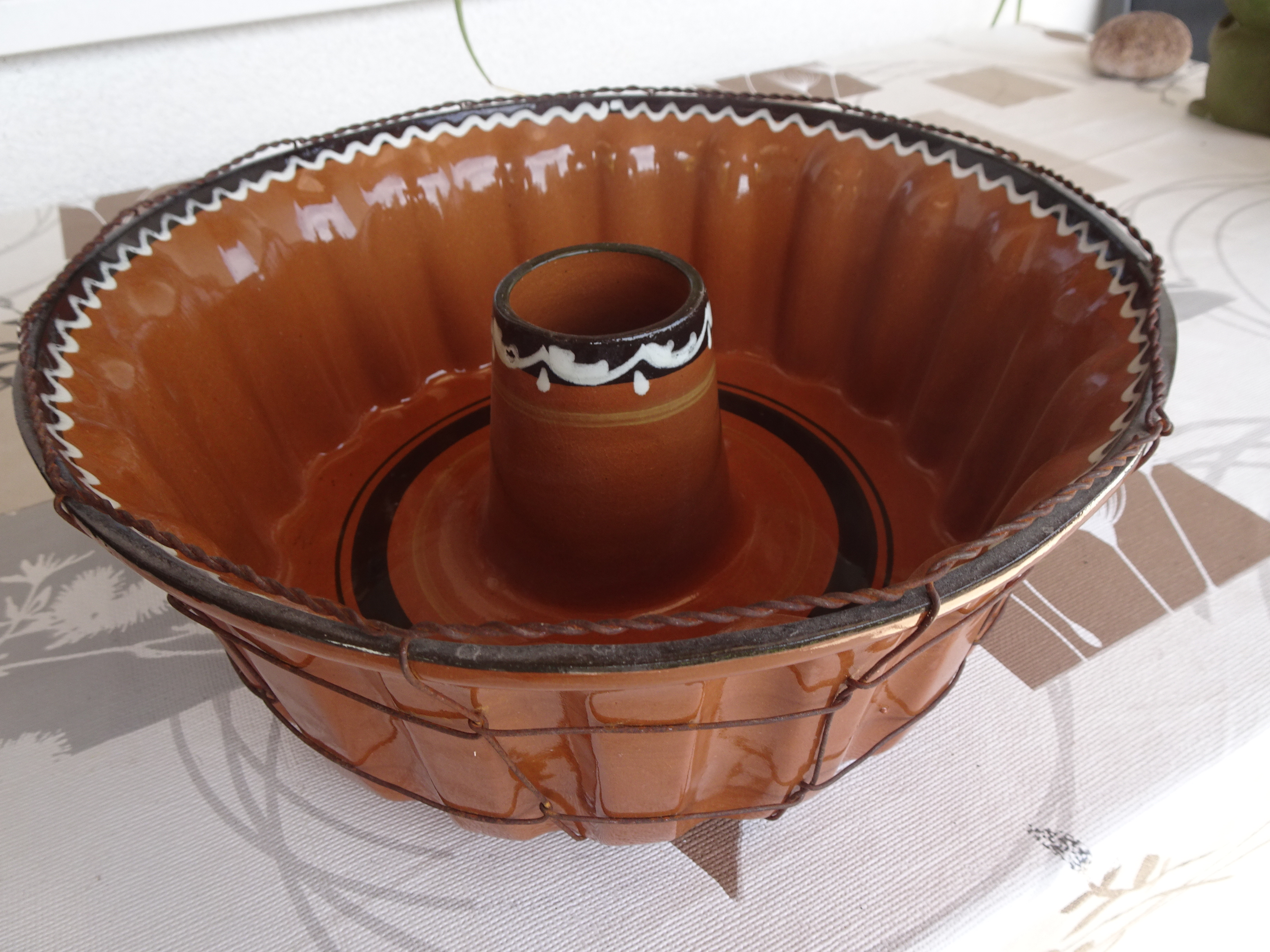
Potičnik - traditional baking mould for potica

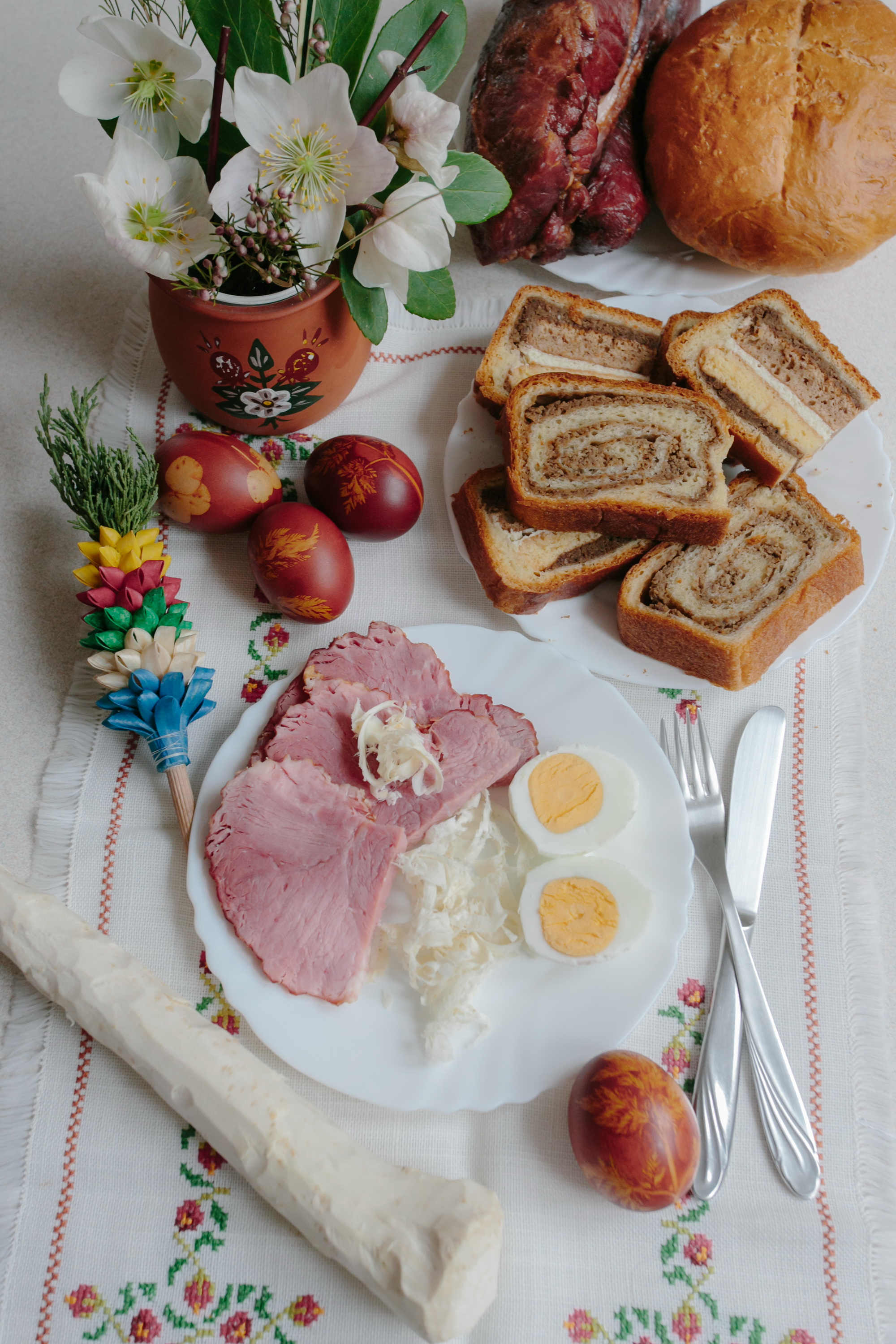
Potica as part of traditional Slovenian Easter breakfast

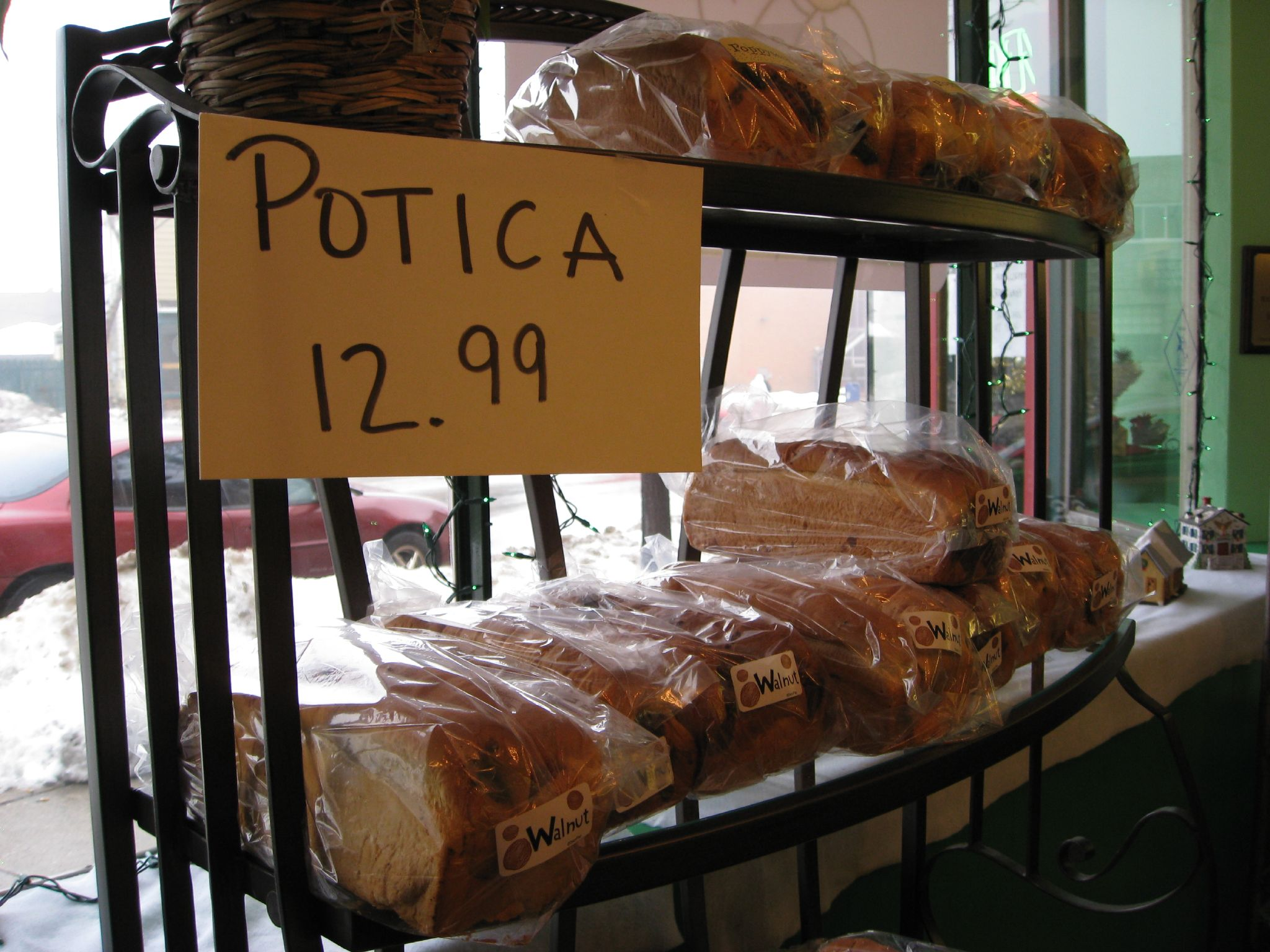
American potica at Kaiser's Six Point Bakery

== Protection regime ==
Slovenska potica has been registered as a traditional speciality guaranteed (TSG) in the European Union since April 2021.

== North America ==
Potica was carried to the United States by Slovene immigrants between the 1880s and 1930s, becoming established in communities in Cleveland, Pittsburgh, and Minnesota's Iron Range, where it is counted among the region's characteristic foods alongside pasties and porketta. In Croatian-American communities, notably the Strawberry Hill neighborhood of Kansas City, Kansas, the same pastry is known by the older name povitica.

Potica and povitica are produced commercially by bakeries across the United States — including century-old producers on Minnesota's Iron Range and family bakeries in Pueblo, Colorado, Kansas City, and the Cleveland area — several of which ship nationally.

== Cultural significance ==
In Slovenia, potica is a festive bread reserved for occasions rather than everyday eating: it marks Easter and Christmas tables, weddings, and christenings, and is described by Slovenia's official cultural portal as a symbol of home and family celebration. Potica also features in Slovenian state protocol as a representative national dish.

== See also ==
- Belokranjska povitica
