= Poppy seed roll =

Type of sweet roulade

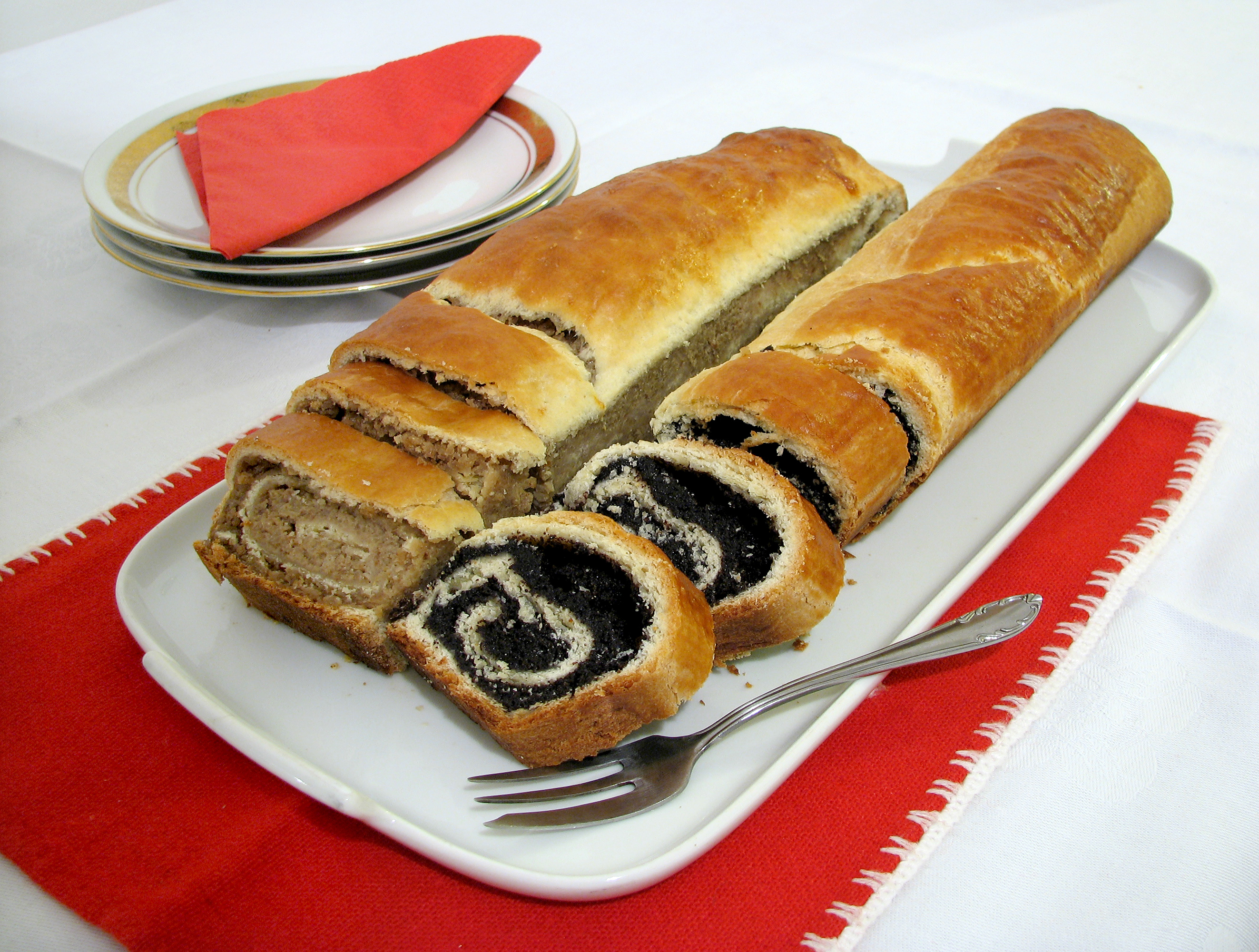
- Walnut (diós) and poppy seed (mákos) bejgli (Hungarian version)
- Type: Roulade
- Region or state: Central and Eastern Europe: Austria, Belarus, Bosnia, Croatia, Czech Republic, Germany, Hungary, Poland, Ukraine, Slovakia, Slovenia, Romania, Serbia, Russia; Northern Europe: Latvia, Lithuania
- Main ingredients: Flour, sugar, egg yolk, milk or sour cream, butter, poppy seeds or walnuts or chestnuts
- Variations: Poppy seed, walnut, chestnut

The poppy seed roll is a roulade consisting of a roll of sweet yeast bread (a sweet bread) with a dense, rich, bittersweet filling of poppy seed. An alternative filling is a paste of minced walnuts, or minced chestnuts.

It is popular in Central Europe and parts of Eastern Europe, where it is commonly eaten at Christmas and Easter time. It is traditional in several cuisines, including Polish (strucla z makiem, strucla makowa; poppy seed cake = makowiec), Kashubian (makówc), Hungarian (mákos bejgli), Slovak (makovník), Czech (makový závin), Austrian (Mohnbeugel, Mohnstrudel or Mohnstriezel), Ukrainian (zavyvanets iz makom завиванець із маком, or makivnyk маківник), Belarusian (makavy rulet макавы рулет), Bosnian, Croatian and Serbian (makovnjača or štrudla sa makom), Slovenian (makova potica), Romanian (coardă cu mac), Russian (rulet s makom рулет с маком), Lithuanian (aguonų vyniotinis), Latvian (magoņmaizīte), German (Mohnstrudel), and Yiddish (mohn roll).

== Ingredients ==
There are two different doughs used, one with yeast and one without. The dough is made of flour, sugar, egg yolk, milk or sour cream and butter, and yeast. The dough may be flavored with lemon or orange zest or rum. The poppy seed filling may contain ground poppy seeds, raisins, butter or milk, sugar or honey, rum and vanilla. Sometimes, apricot jam, which is one of the most popular jams used in Hungarian cuisine, is substituted for sugar. There is another similar dish called walnut roll or nut roll, which contains a filling of ground walnuts and sugar, optionally enriched with raisins, rum, butter or milk and/or lemon zest. This filling may be spiced with cinnamon, nutmeg, cloves or vanilla.

The dough is at first quite heavy, stiff and dry, but with kneading and resting becomes very elastic and strong. It is rolled out into a large sheet, thick or thin depending on taste. One aesthetic principle is that the dough and filling layers should be of equal thickness. Another is that more layers are better. The filling is spread over the dough, which is then rolled into a long cylinder or log. Traditional recipes usually involve brushing the log with the egg white left over from the yolk used in the dough. The unbaked log is gently transferred to a sheet pan, left to rest, then baked until golden brown.

Other recipes use different washes before baking, or a glaze or icing added after baking.

== Variants ==
The poppy seed filling is a paste of ground poppy seeds, milk, butter, sugar and/or honey, often with additional flavorings such as lemon zest and juice. It may have raisins. The walnut filling is a paste of ground walnuts, milk, butter, and sugar, often with additional flavorings such as coffee or orange zest.

In Hungarian cuisine, the rolls, one with each filling, are served together. The combination is known as mákos és diós (poppy seed and walnut). However, in some English language cookbooks there may be no mention of the walnut filling as an alternative. Some other food writers combine the poppy seeds and walnuts together in one filling.

== See also ==
- Babka
- Cozonac
- Hamantash
- Kołacz
- List of desserts
- Lokum
- Makovnjača
- Nut roll
- Strudel
- Tsoureki
