= Earl McRae =

Canadian newspaper columnist, sportswriter and radio sportscaster

- Born: May 3, 1942; Toronto, Ontario
- Died: October 15, 2011 (aged 69); Ottawa, Ontario
- Other names: "Earl the Pearl", "The Four-Eyed Lippy Little Shin-Kicker"
- Occupation: Journalist
- Known for: Journalist, writer and commentator

Earl McRae (May 3, 1942 – October 15, 2011) was a Canadian journalist who wrote a daily general interest column for the Ottawa Sun.

== Early life ==
He was born Earl Gerald Piche in Toronto to Betty Piche, a homemaker, and Earl Piche, a soldier with The Algonquin Regiment in the Canadian Army. He was raised by his mother and step-father, William "Bill" McRae, after his father, Earl Piche, was killed overseas during the war in 1945. He was soon given his step-father's last name of McRae.

McRae came from a family of war veterans, as his own father and uncle were both killed in action during World War II, while his grandfathers, as well as step-father Bill McRae, were all decorated war veterans. This would inspire McRae to devote much of his time to veterans causes and affairs, later earning him the Friendship Award, the highest civilian honour, from the Royal Canadian Legion.

With Bill McRae being in the Royal Canadian Air Force during peacetime, McRae was a so-called army brat, moving around with his family every few years.

== Career ==
After a brief encounter with university, at 19 years of age, McRae dropped out and instead began work at the now-defunct Ottawa Journal as a writer covering the teenage music scene in Ottawa. He later worked at the Cornwall Standard-Freeholder and then the Peterborough Examiner as a general assignment reporter. It was during his time at the Cornwall paper in November 1963 when McRae experienced the arguably most-defining and shocking news story of the 20th century: the assassination of John F. Kennedy:

"When President Kennedy was assassinated I was eating a B.C. Delicious apple at my desk in the newsroom of the Cornwall Standard-Freeholder. The single teletype machine suddenly began chattering, its bulletin bell ringing, and news editor Paul Cragg ran back to check and shouted: 'Oh my God -- Kennedy's been shot in Dallas!' I know exactly what I was wearing.

I can see, hear, and feel it all as if it happened this morning.

Those of us who went through it will never, ever forget where we were and what we were doing around 1 p.m. on November 22, 1963. I phoned as many friends and family members as I could, and in the cold rain of that dark, late November afternoon, I walked back to my rooming house, crying." - McRae remembering November 22, 1963

McRae later worked at the Toronto Star, where he covered major news events such as the 1969 Apollo 11 Moon landing and The Beatles playing at Maple Leaf Gardens, the latter of which, he ambushed the "fab four" for an interview as they were leaving the back entrance of the King Edward Hotel in Toronto. No other journalists were around as they were all waiting at the front of the hotel. With stints writing for Maclean's magazine, McRae became the sports editor of the Canadian Magazine, a Saturday publication that came with the Toronto Star in the 1970s and early 1980s. It was during this time that McRae wrote some noted sports profiles in journalism, from his piece on retired NHL enforcer Reggie Fleming to former CFL great Hal Patterson, the best of these profiles being made into two sports anthologies, The Victors and The Vanquished and A Requiem for Reggie. It was McRae's perceptive and analytical profiles on the world's most famous athletes that gave the Canadian Magazine a wide readership and clout during its hey-day.

After working at the magazine, McRae wrote for Quest magazine in Toronto, the most notable piece being a no-holds-barred lengthy profile on retired NHL player Bobby Orr and his life after hockey. Titled "Poor Bobby", it has been widely studied by journalism students for its biting honesty, eloquent prose and for McRae's steadfastness in remaining an impartial writer while covering a beloved public figure. As writer Stephen Brunt said in his 2006 unauthorized biography Searching for Bobby Orr, McRae's piece on Orr "became a genre exercise. A story about trying to pin down a star who refuses to be interviewed, the narrative tracing the futile chase, the pursuit itself taking the place of the traditional biographical sketch."

McRae was also a successful, albeit controversial, broadcaster in Toronto, hosting his own sports shows on CJCL, CILQ-FM and CBC TV. His zany humour and sharp honesty sparked the ire of Toronto Maple Leafs owner Harold Ballard due to McRae's repeated criticism of Ballard's ownership of the NHL team, with Ballard threatening to pull CJCL's broadcasting rights to the Leafs games due to McRae's commentary. McRae remained at the station and a staple of sports journalism in Toronto.

Aside from his sportscaster career, McRae wrote award-winning film biographies on Sugar Ray Leonard, Joe Montana, and marathoners Bill Rodgers and Alberto Salazar.

After other writing and sportscasting stints in Toronto, in 1986 McRae was hired by the Ottawa Citizen to be its sports columnist, a position he held for six years, before his move to the Ottawa Sun. It was at the Citizen where McRae became a fixture in the city's sports scene. Like in Toronto, McRae became known for his brutally honest pieces on sports events, as well as his talented writing, which made him a popular local figure in the city. During this time, he also hosted a sports show on CKQB-FM (54 Rock).

On December 11, 1989, McRae demonstrated his controversial style in an editorial broadcast on "54 Rock," only five days after Mark Lepine's massacre of female students at École Polytechnique. Despite the fact that Lepine killed fourteen women while explicitly shouting that he hated feminists, McRae believed that feminists were taking the issue too far. In his broadcast, McRae argued that "a frightening number of feminists in this country are politicizing the tragedy for their own idiotic, pea-brained purposes." He blamed "dim-bulbed feministas" for creating an environment in which women are supposed to be living in fear. He also accused feminists of being just as sick as Mark Lepine, noting that women who live in fear of men "demean themselves and their silly misguided philosophy" and prove that "they're empty-headed, misguided fools." McRae's opinion, was reprinted in the Ottawa Citizen on March 14, 1990.

In 1992, McRae began working as a daily interest columnist at the new daily publication, the Ottawa Sun, where he would remain until his death. It was here that McRae spent the longest term of his career, writing for the paper for almost 20 years and becoming the publication's most notable writer, the Ottawa Sun being synonymous with McRae until his death in 2011. During his time at the paper, McRae's columns (for a time called McRae's World) were highly-read, keeping him as one of the city's, and nation's, most popular writers.

His columns varied between introspective, sentimental pieces to quirky and controversial, where he covered everything from international events, like the funeral of Princess Diana to the local Ottawa scene. Writing a daily interest column allowed McRae to branch outside the sports world, an opportunity he loved, and cover anything that sparked an interest in him. He continued to do telling sports profile pieces, such as ones on NHL goaltenders Tom Barrasso and Ray Emery but also focused on local issues; investigative pieces, heart-warming stories, revealing columns on political scandals and articles petitioning for a change, McRae's columns had as much sway with the public as any politician's agenda; in 1996 he was accused by then CFL commissioner Larry Smith of being partially responsible for the folding of the Ottawa Rough Riders due to several critical columns he wrote on the franchise's shaky ownership. It was McRae's columns on Canadian businessman and Ottawa philanthropist Howard Darwin, urging the City of Ottawa to honour the late Darwin with a permanent memorial, that spearheaded the process of renaming Merivale Arena to Howard Darwin Centennial Arena. Canadian Olympic figure skater Barbara Ann Scott was indebted to a column by McRae for having her memorabilia displayed at Ottawa's city hall as well. Notably, he predicted in a 2008 column that Barack Obama would be assassinated by right wing groups while campaigning for the presidency.

McRae founded the Elvis Sighting Society in Ottawa in 1989, a non-profit registered charity that through its fund-raising events has currently raised upwards of $750,000 for various Ottawa-area charities.

== Awards ==
McRae won the gold at the Canadian National Magazine Awards for sports journalism three times, the top honour in its field, plus two silvers, and was nominated eight times. He won three Ontario Newspaper Association awards for his columns. He was runner-up finalist in 2006 for the National Newspaper Award in sports writing for his piece on former heavyweight boxer George Chuvalo. He won 10 column-writing Dunlop Awards for the Sun Media chain. In 2010, McRae was inducted into Algonquin College's Media And Design Hall Of Fame (Journalism) for lifetime achievement.

In 2002, McRae was awarded the Friendship Medal, the highest civilian honour by the Royal Canadian Legion, for his articles on matters pertaining to the military, not the least of which was his column-writing campaign over several weeks that raised some $250,000 from the public to make it possible for a large group of Canadian veterans to return to Ortona, Italy in 1998 for a reunion ceremony.

In 2007, McRae won the Canadian Consumers' Choice "Man of the Year" honour in a Leger Marketing poll of consumers in the Ottawa-Gatineau area.

== Death ==
On the early evening of October 15, 2011, McRae died of a massive heart attack he sustained while in the Ottawa Sun newsroom. He had just returned from covering the funeral of a local cyclist who had been struck and killed by a motorist and McRae was set to write a lengthy feature piece on the tragedy. He collapsed shortly after arriving to the newsroom. Paramedics were called to the scene and rushed McRae to the hospital but doctors were unable to revive him. He was 69 years old.

== Legacy ==
Earl McRae is widely regarded as one of the greatest sports journalists in Canadian history, with veteran sports writer Stan Fischler calling his Requiem for Reggie piece, "The best hockey story ever written." TSN broadcaster Bob McKenzie credited McRae as his inspiration for becoming a sports journalist, saying "I remember waiting for the Saturday Star to show up so I could read him. He was a special talent." McRae's death brought an outpouring of accolades from the media world, with journalists like The Globe and Mail's Roy MacGregor, a friend and former colleague of McRae's, remembering the larger-than-life journalist as "the funniest person that you ever would've met in your life," adding McRae was the "best sports writer this country ever saw." Prime Minister Stephen Harper released a statement saying McRae was "a fixture in the Ottawa media scene" and that his writing would be missed by many friends and family, while Ottawa Mayor Jim Watson said McRae had an uncanny way of bringing words to life, adding "From his work with the Elvis Sighting Society to his journalistic awards, he has left a huge mark on our country and city and will be missed."
