= HMS Delight =

Thirteen ships of the Royal Navy have borne the name HMS Delight:

- English ship Delight (1583) was a discovery vessel wrecked in 1583 off Sable Island. She may not have been part of the English Navy, and was possibly part of Sir Humphrey Gilbert's 1583 expedition to Newfoundland.
- HMS Delight (1686) was a four-gun hoy purchased in 1686 and sold in 1713.
- HMS Delight (1709) was a 14-gun sixth-rate launched in 1709 and sold in 1712.
- HMS Delight (1778) was a 14-gun sloop launched in 1778 and foundered in 1781.
- HMS Delight (1801) was an 18-gun sloop, formerly the French corvette Sans Pareille. She was captured in 1801 by HMS Mercury and sold in 1805.
- HMS Delight (1806) was a 16-gun brig-sloop launched in 1806 and captured by the French in 1808 when she became stranded off Calabria.
- HMS Delight was a 16-gun brig, formerly the French brig Friedland, name vessel of her class of six brigs. HMS Standard captured her in 1808; Delight was paid off in 1810 and sold in 1814.
- HMS Delight (1819) was a 10-gun brig-sloop of the Cherokee class launched in 1819 and wrecked in 1824 with the loss of al aboard. She had been carrying some 103 slaves that she had rescued from Providence Island where they had been stranded when the French brig Lys had wrecked there.
- HMS Delight (1829) was a 10-gun Cherokee-class brig-sloop launched in 1829 and sold in 1844. She served as a Post Office Packet Service packet.
- HMS Delight (1856) was a wood screw Albacore-class gunboat launched in 1856 and sold in 1867. She was later renamed M. A. Starr.
- HMS Delight (H38) was a D-class destroyer launched in 1932 and sunk in 1940.
- HMS Delight was to have been a destroyer, ordered in 1945, but cancelled the following year.
- HMS Delight (D119) was a Daring-class destroyer launched in 1950. She was previously to have been named HMS Disdain, but was renamed in 1946 prior to launching. She was sold in 1970.
