= Delight Evans =

American Entertainment writer

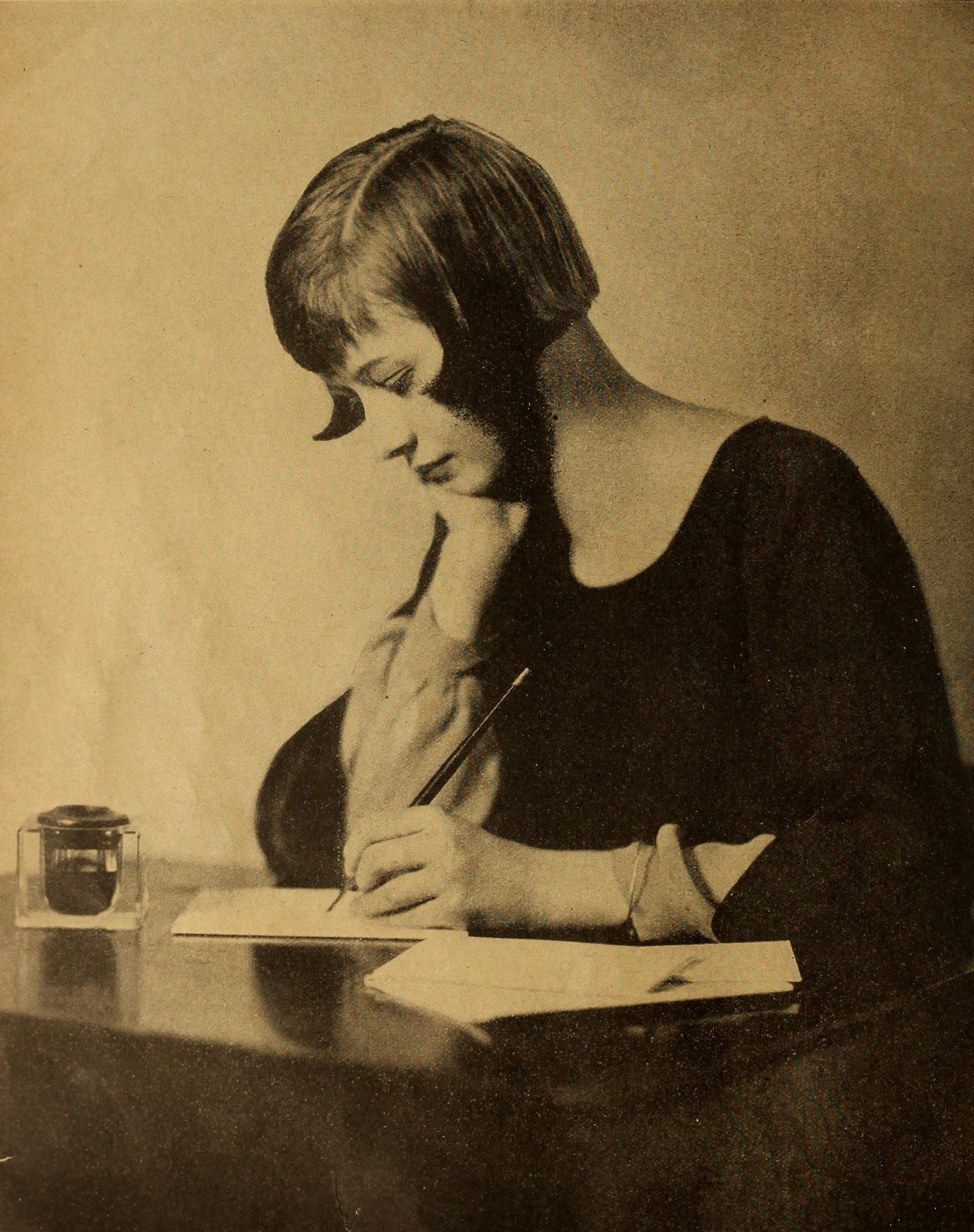
- Evans in 1923
- Born: Cordelia D. Evans; 1902; Fort Wayne, Indiana, U.S.
- Died: c. 1985 (aged 82–83)
- Occupations: Writer, editor, film critic
- Years active: 1917–1952
- Spouse: Herbert Crooker (m. 1924; died 1960)

Cordelia D. "Delight" Evans (1902 – c. 1985) was an American entertainment writer, editor, and film critic who was most widely known for her career as the editor of Screenland Magazine. Before accepting her career-making position at Screenland, Evans worked for Photoplay Magazine for six years. Screenland and Photoplay were both popular fan magazines that allowed fans to connect with movies outside the theaters. Some of the magazines' content consisted of movie reviews, movie promotions, and spreads of popular actors and actresses. Evans first started working for Screenland Magazine in October 1924 where she wrote reviews for various iconic films of that time. In 1929, Evans was promoted to Editor of the magazine. Nine years later in 1938, her success and ambitious attitude lead her to her own radio program, Food Secrets of the Movie Stars.

== Early life ==
Delight Evans was born in Fort Wayne, Indiana, on Fulton Street in 1902 to Mr and Mrs. Joe O. Evans. Evans had an interest in movies and entertainment from a young age. In high school, she took part in school activities such as writing for her school newspaper and playing music. At the age of 13, Evans entered the "Beauty and Brains" contest put on by Photoplay magazine in hopes of becoming a film actress. However, the contest authorities had no intention of making film stars out of the young women that had entered. Because of this disappointment, Evans was not able to break into the movie business at the time.

At the age of 15, Evans sent a story she wrote to Photoplay Magazine's editorial office. The magazine bought her story and contacted her, inviting her to visit the editor of Photoplay in Chicago. Upon meeting Evans, the editor was taken aback by her young age. Nevertheless, he was impressed with her work and he offered her a position at Photoplay as an entertainment writer for movies. Evans, despite being enrolled at Fort Wayne High School where she wrote for the school newspaper, accepted the offer and began working on the editorial staff of Photoplay in December 1917. Her first published articles were on Douglas Fairbanks and Mary McAllister. In 1919 Evans was promoted and relocated to New York City. By 1922, she was the associate editor of Photoplay. Evans wrote seventy-six stories for Photoplay through 1923 until she joined Screenland Magazine.

== Career ==
In 1924, Evans took a position at Screenland Magazine writing movie reviews. In 1929, she was called before the Board of Magazine directors and was promoted to the Editor of Screenland. Evans promised the Board Screenland would have the biggest circulation of any entertainment magazine. Sure enough, after Evans became the editor, the magazine's circulation nearly doubled and continued to grow rapidly. Delight Evans' reviews were known as the most widely read and quoted screen criticisms. Evans held the position of editor from 1924 to 1948.

Evans wrote reviews for various types of entertainment such as screenplays like the 1926 comedy, Kiki starring Norma Talmadge. She also reviewed musicals including The Cock-Eyed World (1929) and major films such as Captain January (1936) starring Shirley Temple and Saturday's Children (1940) starring John Garfield. Evans would review at least five entertainment pieces in each issue of Screenland Magazine. In the May–July 1926 issue of Screenland, it was written that:"Delight Evans reviews all the important films for Screenland. Her criticism are just and no one takes greater joy in finding work well done or pictures that are pleasurable."

Evans had the pleasure of interviewing hundreds of celebrities throughout her career. Many people in the film industry not only valued her work and advice, but her friendship as well. Actors such as Mary Pickford and The Gish Girls and famous directors such as D.W. Griffith were good friends of Evans. D.W. Griffith actually asked Evans to write titles for his pictures.

In 1938, Evans used her knowledge and experience she gained through celebrity interviews on her own radio program called Food Secrets of the Movie Stars. The program discussed the habits, hobbies, and favorite dishes of Hollywood stars. The show was set to air every Thursday evening for thirteen weeks. She completed her radio show while still holding the editor position at Screenland. Evans left Screenland in 1948.

== Personal life ==
Evans married Herbert Crooker on May 29, 1924. Herb held jobs as Eastern Publicity manager for Warner Bros. and Metro-Goldwyn-Mayer (MGM). He died on January 21, 1960, at the age of 66.

She died ca. 1985.
