= Belokranjska povitica =

Slovenian dessert

- Course: Dessert
- Place of origin: Slovenia
- Region or state: White Carniola
- Main ingredients: Flour, water, ricotta cheese, eggs, heavy cream, oil, and butter
- Other information: TSG

Belokranjska povitica (English: White Carniola rolled pastry) is a Slovenian national dish. It was supposedly brought to the White Carniola region by the Uskoks, who were Croatian Habsburg soldiers that inhabited the areas of the eastern Adriatic area. The name itself, povitica, explains the preparation. The term povitica derived from the verb poviti 'to roll'.

The dough is made of flour, water, salt, and 1/2 teaspoon of vinegar. The dough rests for half an hour. The dough is then rolled out and stretched out as thin as possible.

The filling is made of ricotta cheese (Slovene: skuta), eggs, heavy cream, oil, and butter. The filling is spread evenly on the rolled-out dough, rolled into a spiral, and placed in a greased baking tin.

== Protection regime ==
- Traditional specialities guaranteed (TSG) in the European Union

== See also ==
- List of pastries
- Nut roll, A US dessert that is similar to or derived from Belokranjska povitica.
- Slovenian cuisine
