= Strawberry Hill (Kansas City, Kansas) =

Kansas City neighborhood

- Neighborhood
- Location in Kansas City, Kansas
- Coordinates: 39°06′46″N 94°37′08″W
- Country: US
- State: Kansas
- County: Wyandotte
- City: Kansas City, Kansas
- Platted: Late 1800s
- Time zone: UTC-6 (Central)
  - Summer (DST): UTC-5 (CDT)
- ZIP Code: 66101
- Area code: 913
- Website: thestrawberryhill.com

Strawberry Hill is a historic neighborhood in Kansas City, Kansas, located on a bluff overlooking the confluence of the Kansas River and Missouri River at Kaw Point. It was settled in the late 19th century by Slavic immigrants—primarily Croatians, Slovenes, and Serbians who worked in the nearby meatpacking industry. The area is known for its strong Eastern European heritage, which is preserved at landmarks like the Strawberry Hill Museum and Cultural Center.

== History ==
The area was originally named Splitlog's Hill. Mathias Splitlog, a Cayuga tribe member and millionaire, purchased the land in 1870 with the goal of building a grand manor. After his death, his daughters sold parcels of the land, including a significant plot to the Right Reverend John Ward, the second Bishop of the Roman Catholic Diocese of Leavenworth, which helped shape the neighborhood's development.

After the land was subdivided in the late 1800s, the neighborhood began to fill in, first with Irish and German immigrants, and then by Croatian and Slovene immigrants from the Primorje-Gorski Kotar and Karlovac areas. Most Strawberry Hill residents at the turn of the 20th Century worked in the meat-packing industry, whose factories and lots were in close proximity to the West Bottoms neighborhood in Kansas City, Kansas.

The growing Slavic community established several parishes, which became centers of community life. St. John the Baptist Catholic Parish was founded in 1900, followed by St. George Serbian Orthodox Church in 1906, Holy Family Catholic Parish in 1908, and Holy Trinity Orthodox Church in 1917. During the 1918-1919 influenza pandemic, the community was devastated, leaving many children orphaned. In response, St. John the Baptist parish established an orphanage in a former saloon, which operated for several decades.

In the 1950s, the construction of Interstate 70 cut through the neighborhood, razing nearly one third of its homes. A 1982 neighborhood study described the impact: "In Kansas City, Kansas a tragic example of this attitude occurred in 1957 when 4½ blocks were demolished—219 households, a number of small shops and a neighborhood park—to make way for a new highway."

In the early 1990s, the neighborhood had a new wave of immigration because refugees, primarily Croats and Bosniaks, fled the Yugoslav Wars.

In the 21st century, Strawberry Hill has experienced a housing boom, with residents attracted to its historic character and proximity to downtown Kansas City. This has led to concerns about gentrification and housing affordability for long-time residents. The University of Kansas Health System opened a mental and behavioral health campus in the former EPA offices in the neighborhood in 2019, and new apartment complexes have been developed along Central Avenue.

== See also ==
- List of books about Wyandotte County, Kansas
