= Turkish Delight (disambiguation) =

Turkish delight is a family of confections based on a gel of starch and sugar.

Turkish delight or Turkish Delight may also refer to:

== Entertainment ==
- Turkish Delight (1927 film)
- A chapter in C. S. Lewis's 1950 novel The Lion, The Witch, and The Wardrobe
- Turkish Delight (1973 film), a 1973 Dutch film directed by Paul Verhoeven
  - Turks Fruit (novel), by Jan Wolkers, on which the film is based
- Turkish Delight, a 1973 television drama written by Caryl Churchill

== Food ==
- Fry's Turkish Delight, a chocolate sweet made by Cadbury
- A beverage made from salep orchid tuber flour, popular mainly in Turkey

== Nicknames ==
- Despina Storch (1895–1918), a Turkish spy in World War I
- Turhan Bey (1922–2012), an Austrian actor

== Other uses ==
- Turkish Delight, a type of shrapnel shell
