= Poppy seed =

Edible oilseed obtained from poppy

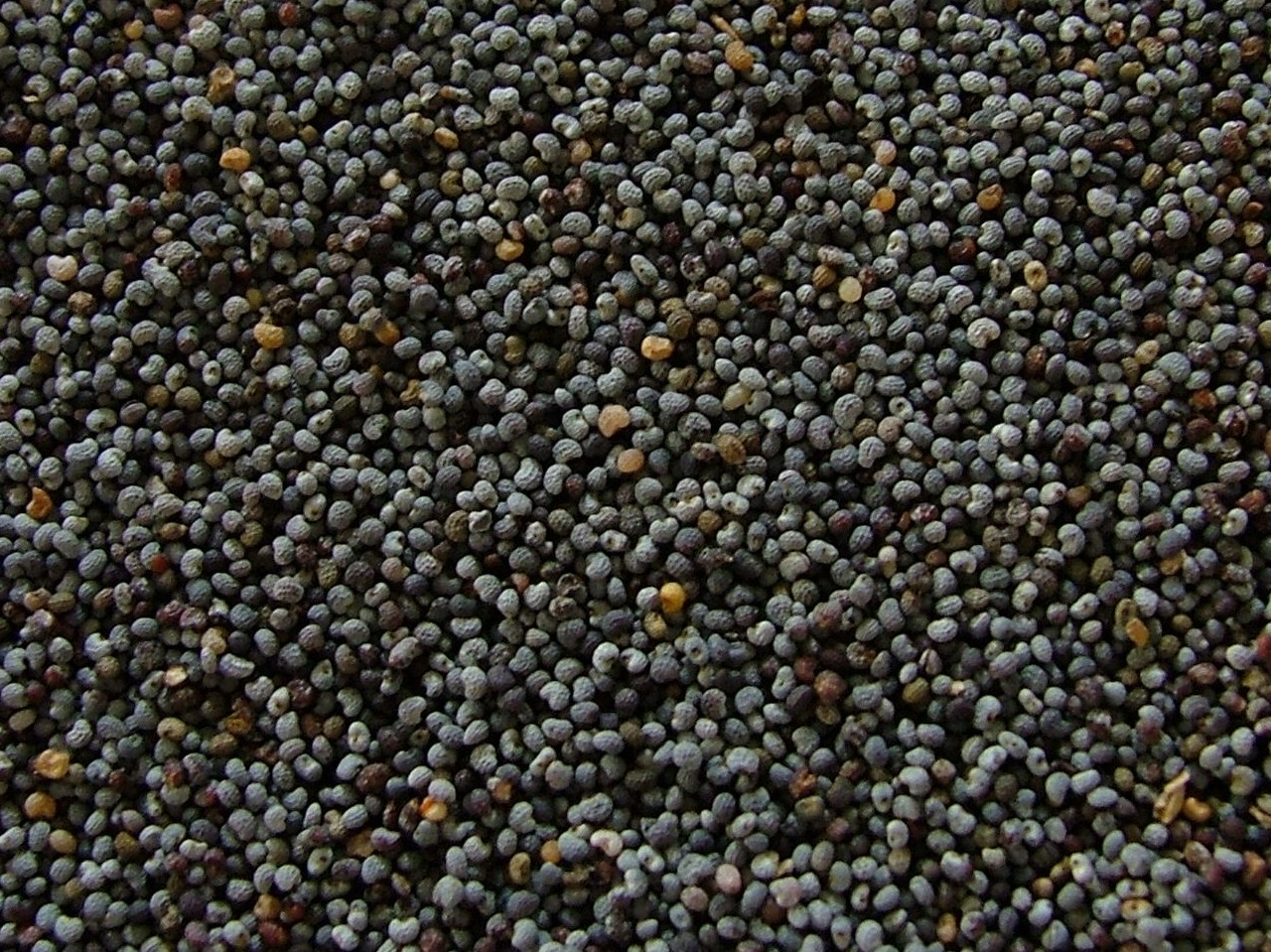
Black poppy seeds in bulk

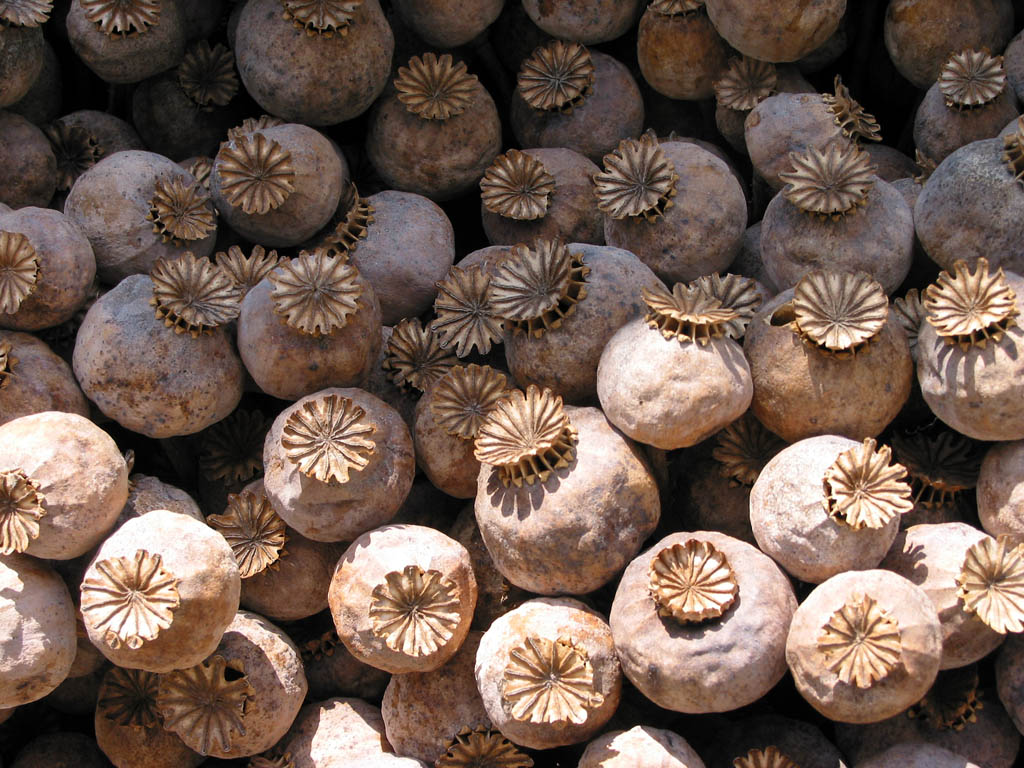
Dry poppy seed pods containing ripe poppy seeds

Poppy seeds are a type of oilseed obtained from the poppy plant (Papaver somniferum). The tiny, kidney-shaped seeds have been harvested from dried seed pods by various civilizations for thousands of years. Poppy seeds are widely used in many countries, especially in Central Europe and South Asia, where they are legally grown, used in food products, and sold in shops. The seeds are used either whole, or ground into meal as an ingredient in many foods – especially in pastry and bread. It is also possible to press poppyseeds into edible poppyseed oil.

== History ==
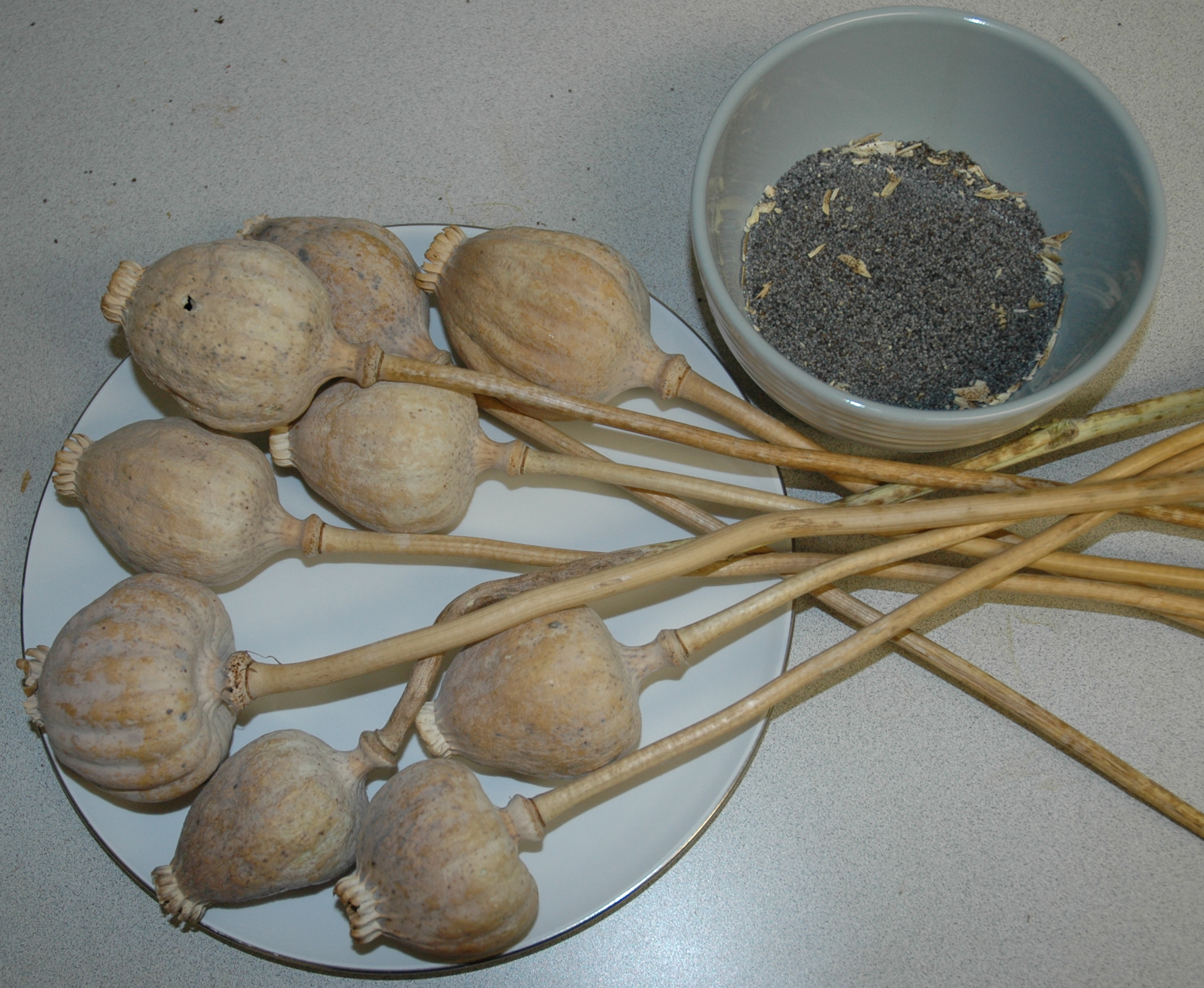
Dried poppy seed pods with stems attached (poppy straws), and seeds (in bowl)

The poppy seed is mentioned in ancient medical texts from many civilizations. For instance, the Egyptian Ebers Papyrus, written c. 1550 BCE, lists the poppy seed as a sedative. The Minoan civilization (approximately 2700 to 1450 BCE), a Bronze Age civilization which arose on the island of Crete, cultivated poppies for their seeds, and used a mixture of milk, opium and honey to calm crying babies. The Sumerians are another civilization that are known to have grown poppy seeds.

== Description ==
Poppy seeds are less than a millimeter in length, kidney-shaped, and have a pitted surface. It takes about 3,300 poppy seeds to make up a gram, and between 1 and 2 million seeds to make up a pound. The primary flavor compound is 2-pentylfuran.

The seeds are cultivated for the flowers they produce. Annual and biennial poppies are used to cultivate from seed as they are not difficult to propagate, and can be put directly in the ground during winter. The California poppy (Eschscholzia californica), for example, is a striking orange wildflower that grows in the Western and Northwestern United States.

== Production and export ==
The poppy seeds harvest can be a by-product of cultivation of Papaver somniferum for opium, poppy straw, or both opium and poppy straw. However, harvesting for poppy seeds of superior quality is in conflict with harvesting for opium as poppy seeds should be harvested when they are ripe, after the seed pod has dried. Traditionally, opium is harvested while the seed pods are green and the seeds have just begun to grow and their latex is abundant. Poppy straw can be a by-product of cultivation of poppy seeds. Compared to the seed pod and straw, the seeds contain very low levels of opiates. The seeds may be washed to obtain poppy tea but a large amount is needed, around 300–400 g depending on the levels of opiates.

Since poppy seeds are relatively expensive, they are sometimes mixed with the seeds of Amaranthus paniculatus, which closely resemble poppy seeds.

In 2024, Turkey produced 8,441 tonnes and Serbia 1,079 tonnes. The Czech Republic was the leading country exporting poppy seeds in 2024 with 23,600 tonnes (approximately 53 million lbs), followed by Hungary, the Netherlands, and Turkey.

== Nutrition ==
Poppy seed
Nutritional value per 100 g (3.5 oz)
- Energy: 2,196 kJ (525 kcal)
- Carbohydrates: 28.13 g
- Sugars: 2.99 g
- Dietary fiber: 19.5 g
- Fat: 41.56 g
- Saturated: 4.517 g
- Monounsaturated: 5.982 g
- Polyunsaturated: 28.569 g
- Protein: 21.22 g
Vitamins and minerals
Vitamins	Quantity %DV^{†}
Thiamine (B1)	71% 0.854 mg
Riboflavin (B2)	8% 0.100 mg
Niacin (B3)	6% 0.896 mg
Pantothenic acid (B5)	0% 0 mg
Vitamin B6	15% 0.247 mg
Folate (B9)	21% 82 μg
Choline	9% 52.1 mg
Vitamin C	1% 1 mg
Vitamin E	12% 1.77 mg
Minerals	Quantity %DV^{†}
Calcium	111% 1440 mg
Iron	54% 9.76 mg
Magnesium	83% 347 mg
Manganese	99% 2.285 mg
Phosphorus	70% 870 mg
Potassium	24% 719 mg
Sodium	1% 26 mg
Zinc	64% 7.0 mg
- Other constituents: Quantity
- Water: 5.95 g
- Full Link to USDA Database entry
- ^{†}Percentages estimated using US recommendations for adults, except for potassium, which is estimated based on expert recommendation from the National Academies.

Poppy seeds are 6% water, 28% carbohydrates, 42% fat, and 21% protein (table). The fat content is primarily from the polyunsaturated fat, linoleic acid, an omega-6 fatty acid (source in table).

In a reference amount of 100 g (3.5 oz), poppy seeds provide 525 calories, and are a rich source of thiamin, folate, and several dietary minerals, including calcium, iron, magnesium, manganese, phosphorus, and zinc (each having 20% or more of the Daily Value, table).

== Food products ==
=== Intact seeds ===
Whole poppy seeds are widely used as a spice and decoration in and on top of many baked goods and pastries. In North America they are used in and on many food items such as poppyseed muffins, rusk, bagels (like the Montreal-style bagel), bialys, and cakes such as sponge cake. Poppy seeds can also be used like sesame seeds, added to hamburger buns or to make a bar of candy. The bars are made from boiled seeds mixed with sugar or with honey. This is especially common in the Balkans, Greece and even in the cuisines of former Austro-Hungarian countries.

The color of poppy seeds is important in some uses. According to The Joy of Cooking, "the most desirable come from Holland and are a slate-blue color." When used as a thickener in some dishes, white poppy seeds are preferred, having less impact on the color of the food. In other dishes, black poppy seeds are preferred, for maximum impact. Blue poppy seeds are used in various German breads and desserts as well as in Polish cuisine.

=== Paste ===
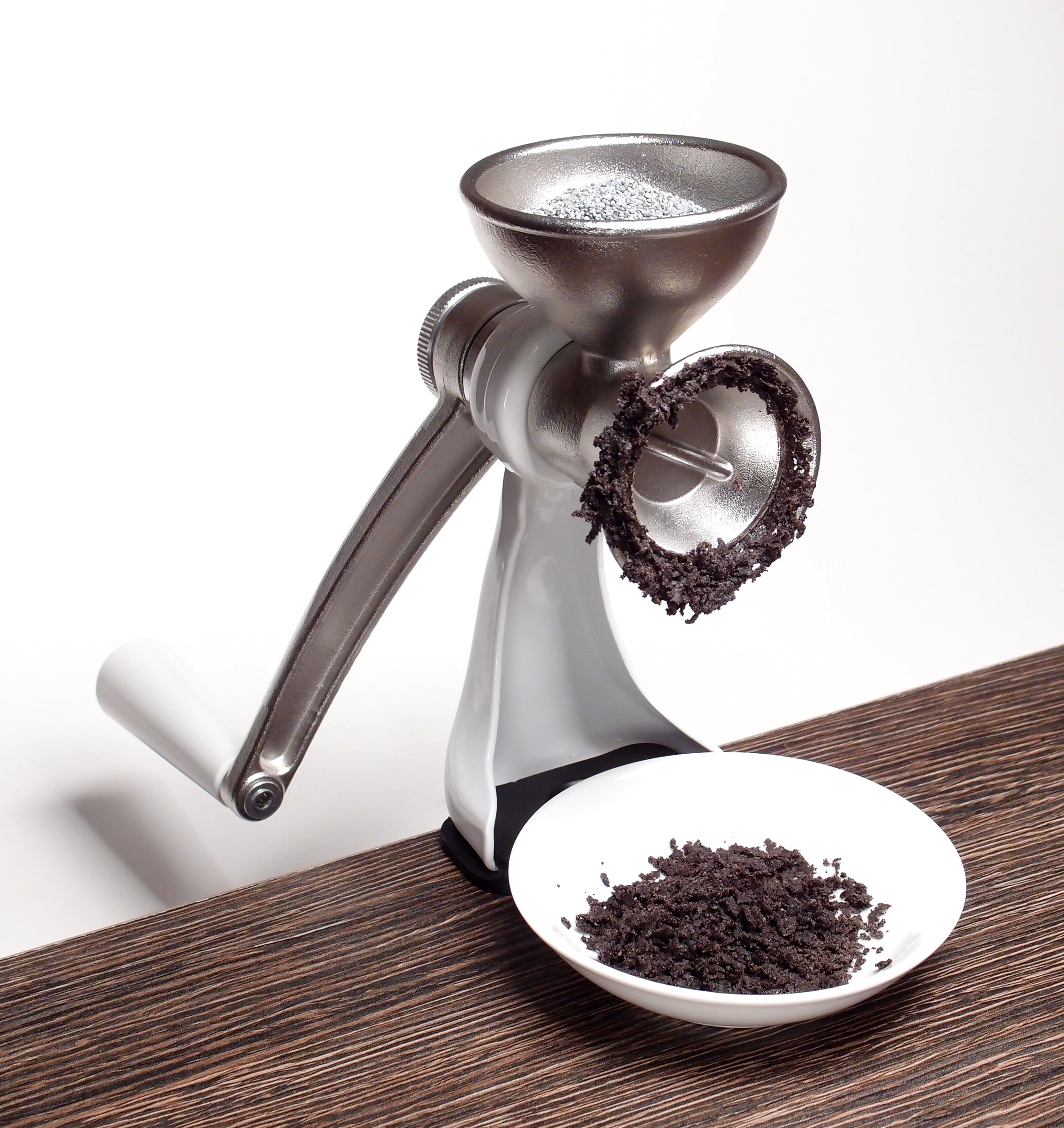
Grinding poppy seeds

Poppy seeds can be ground using a generic tool such as a mortar and pestle or a small domestic type electric blade grinder, or a special purpose poppy seed grinder. A poppy seed grinder (mill) is a type of burr grinder with a set aperture that is too narrow for intact poppy seeds to pass through. A burr grinder produces a more uniform and less oily paste than these other tools.

The poppy seed paste is used for fillings in pastries, sometimes mixed with butter or milk and sugar. The ground filling is used in poppy seed rolls and some croissants and may be flavored with lemon or orange zest, rum and vanilla with raisins, heavy cream, cinnamon, and chopped blanched almonds or walnuts added. For sweet baked goods, sometimes instead of sugar a tablespoon of jam, or other sweet binding agent, like syrup is substituted. The poppy seed for fillings is best when they are finely and freshly ground because this will make a big difference in the pastry filling's texture and taste.

Poppy seed paste is available commercially, in cans. Poppy seeds are very high in oil, so commercial pastes normally contain sugar, water, and an emulsifier such as soy lecithin to keep the paste from separating. Commercial pastes also contain food preservatives to keep them from becoming rancid.

In the United States, commercial pastes are marketed under brand names including Solo and American Almond. Per 30 gram serving, the American Almond poppy seed paste has 120 calories, 4.5 grams fat, and 2 grams protein.

=== Oil ===
Poppy seeds are pressed to form poppyseed oil, a valuable commercial oil that has multiple culinary and industrial uses.

=== Other uses ===
Poppy seeds are often used as bird seed, in which case they are usually called maw seeds.

== Use by cuisine ==
Poppy seeds are used around the world in various cuisines.

=== European cuisine ===
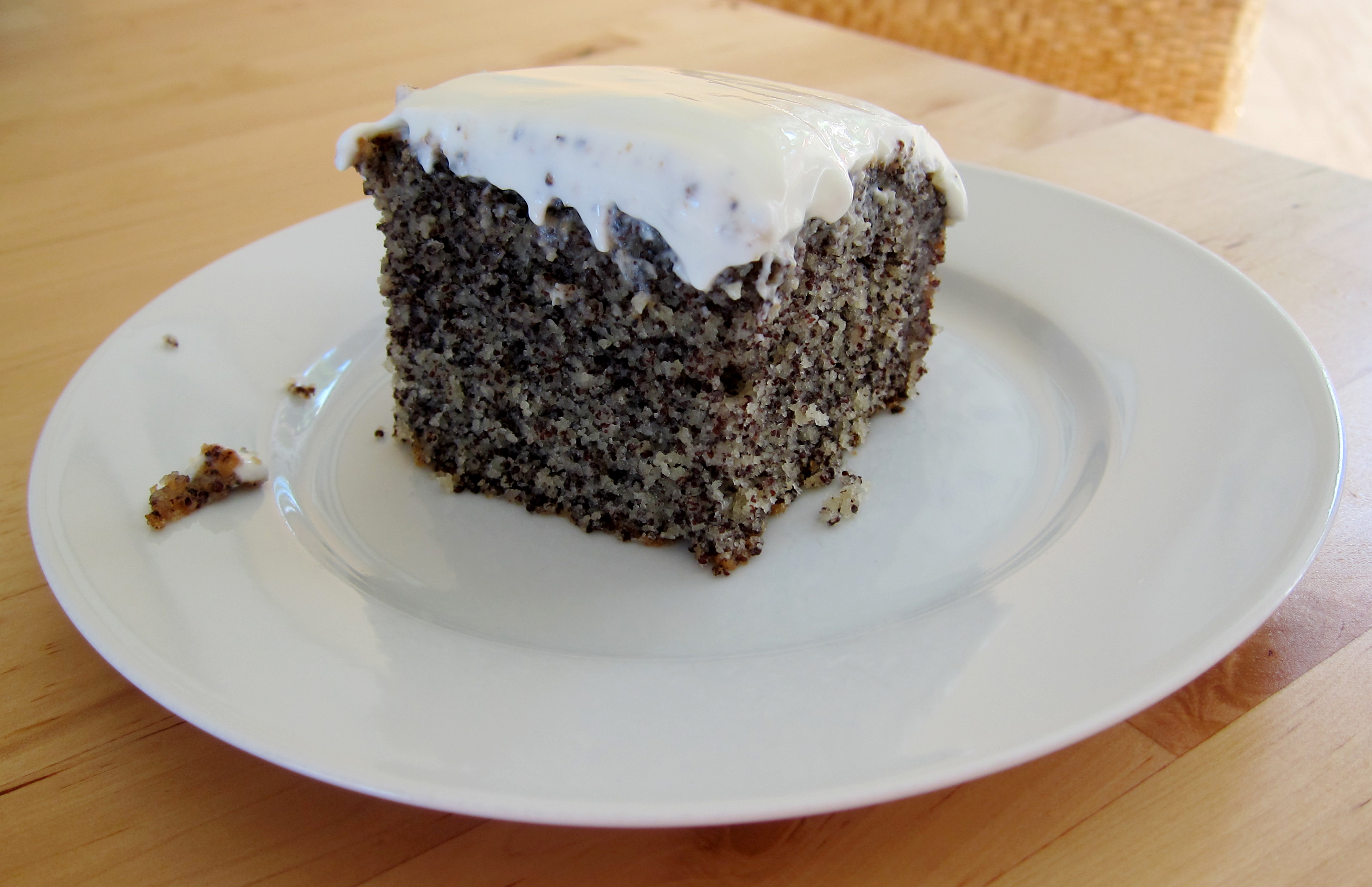
Turkish poppy-seed cake

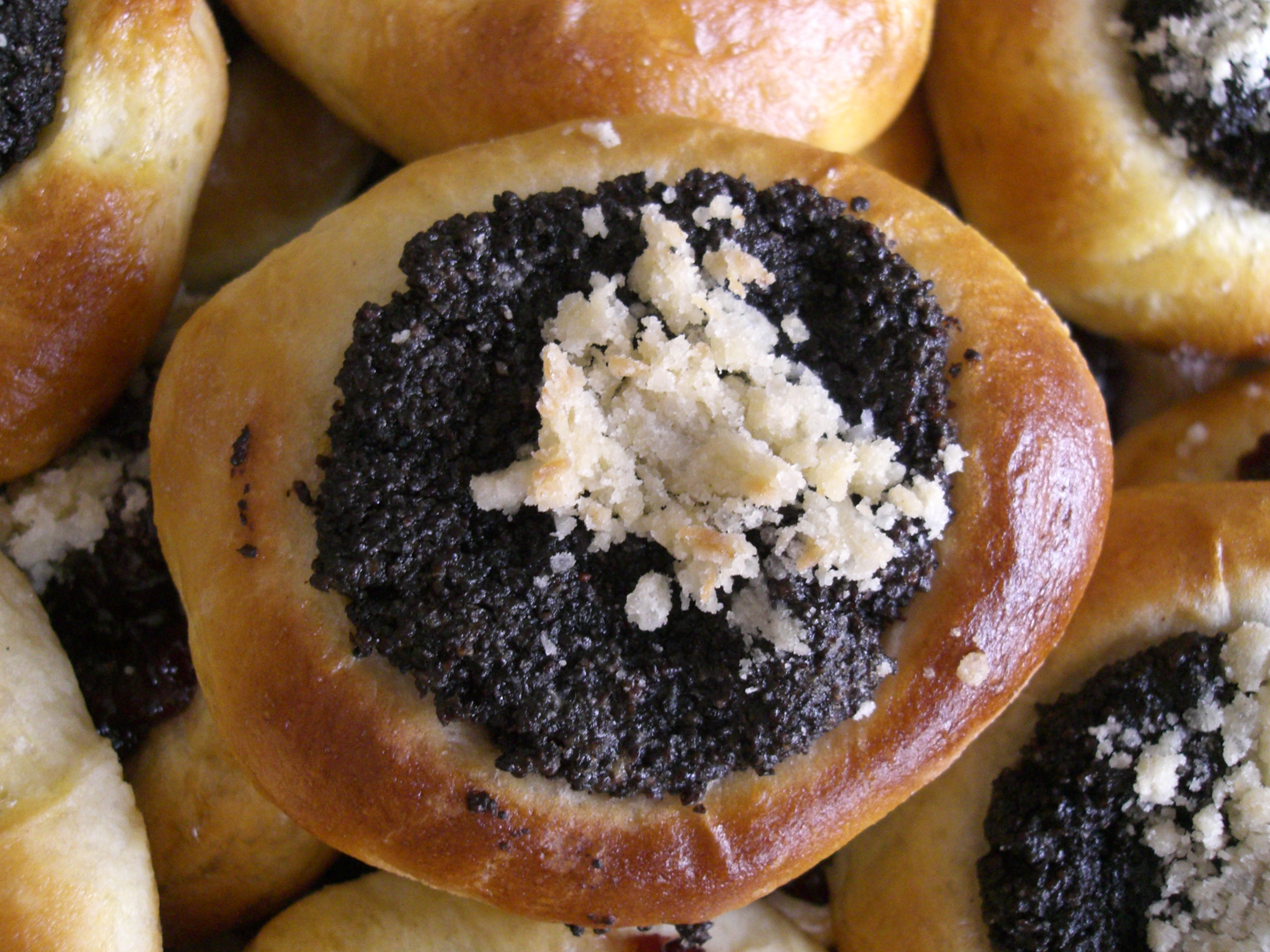
Czech blue poppy-filled cake

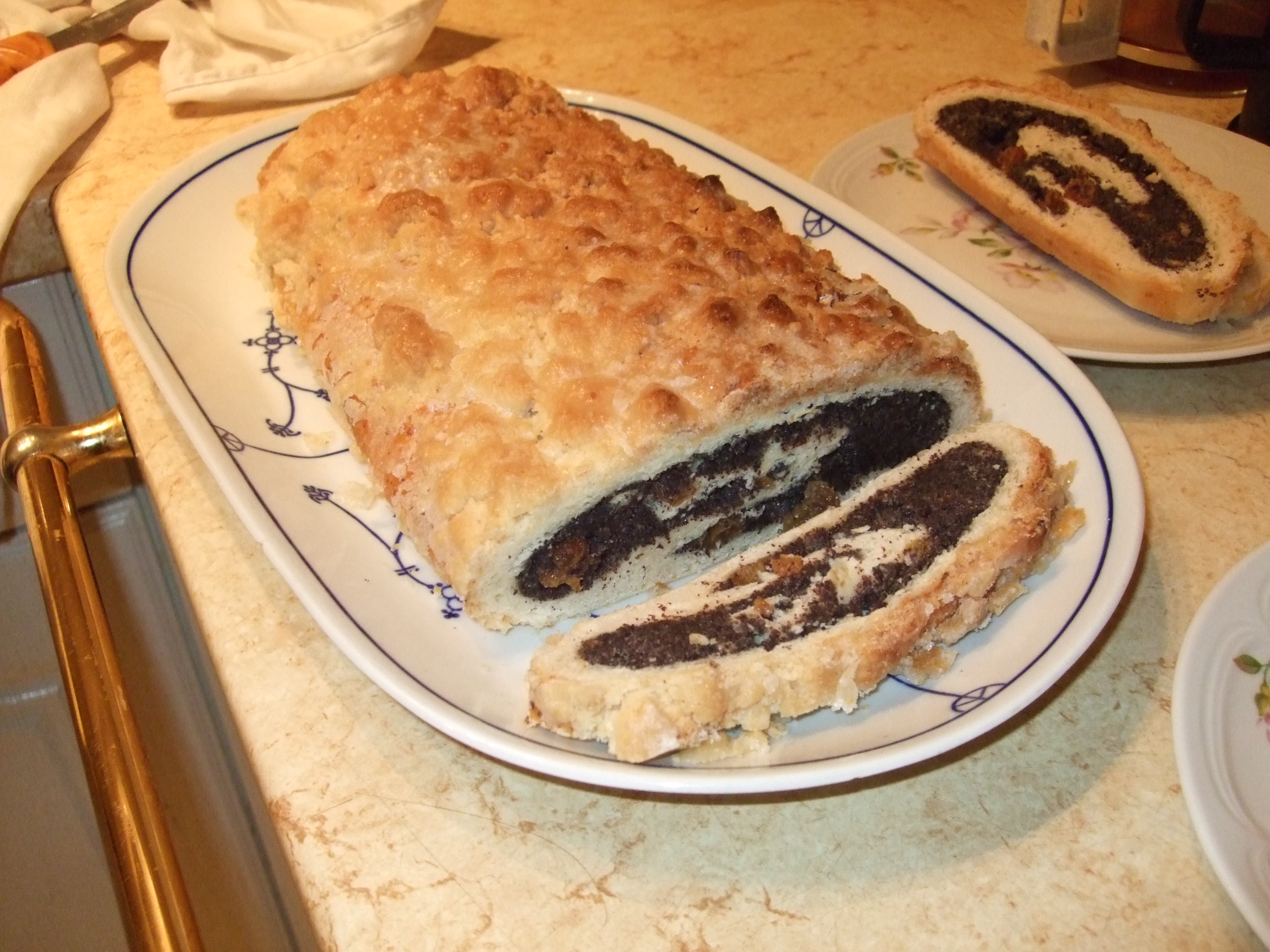
German Mohnstollen

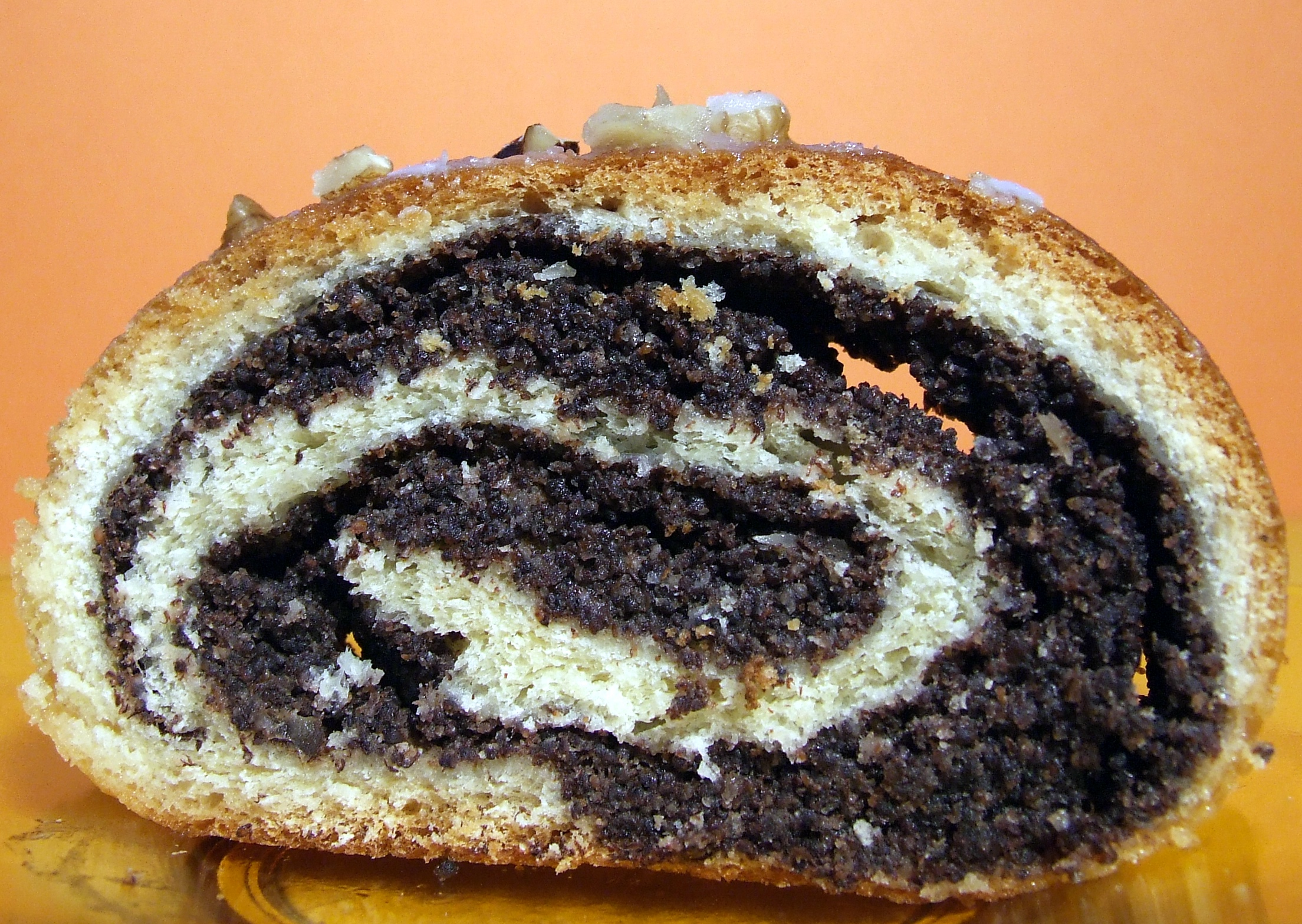
Polish makowiec, Slovak makovník, a nut roll filled with poppy seed paste

Across Europe, buns and soft white bread pastries are often sprinkled on top with black and white poppy seeds (for example cozonac, kalach, kolache and kołacz). The seeds of the Czech blue poppy (food safety cultivars Papaver somniferum) are widely consumed in many parts of Central and Eastern Europe. The sugared, milled mature seeds are eaten with pasta, or they are boiled with milk and used as filling or topping on various kinds of sweet pastry. Milling of mature seeds is carried out either industrially or at home, where it is generally done with a manual poppy seed mill.

Blue poppy seeds are widely used in Austrian, Croatian, Czech, Danish, German, Hungarian, Lithuanian, Polish, Romanian, Russian, Serbian, Slovak, Slovenian, Turkish and Ukrainian cuisines.

The states of former Yugoslavia (notably North Macedonia and Serbia, but also Croatia and Bosnia) have a long tradition of preparing poppy seed pastry (štrudla, baklava, pajgle) and dishes (pasta with poppy seeds). In Slovenia blue poppy seeds are used in traditional dishes such as prekmurska gibanica and makova potica.

In Poland, Hungary, Lithuania and Eastern Slovakia, a traditional dessert is prepared for the Christmas Eve dinner from poppy seeds. They are ground and mixed with water or milk; round yeast biscuits (kūčiukai in Lithuanian; opekance or bobalky in Slovak) are soaked in the resulting poppy seed 'milk' (poppy milk) and served cold.

In Central Europe, poppy strudel is very popular, especially during Christmas. In Germany, Poland and countries belonging to the former Austro-Hungarian Empire, poppy seed pastries called Mohnkuchen are often eaten around Christmas time. Recipes for Mohnstriezel use poppy seed soaked in water for two hours or boiled in milk. A recipe for Ukrainian poppyseed cake recommends preparing the seeds by immersing in boiling water, straining and soaking in milk overnight.

==== Jewish cuisine ====
In Eastern European Jewish cuisine, pastries filled with black poppy seeds in a sugary paste are traditional during Purim, which occurs exactly one month before Passover and approximately a month before Easter. Traditional pastries include poppy seed kalács and hamantashen, both sometimes known as beigli (also spelled bejgli). Poppy seed hamantashen were the main traditional food eaten by Ashkenazi Jews at Purim until the filling was replaced by other fruit and nut fillings. Poppy seed pastries are common in Jewish bakeries and delicatessens throughout the United States.

=== Indian cuisine ===
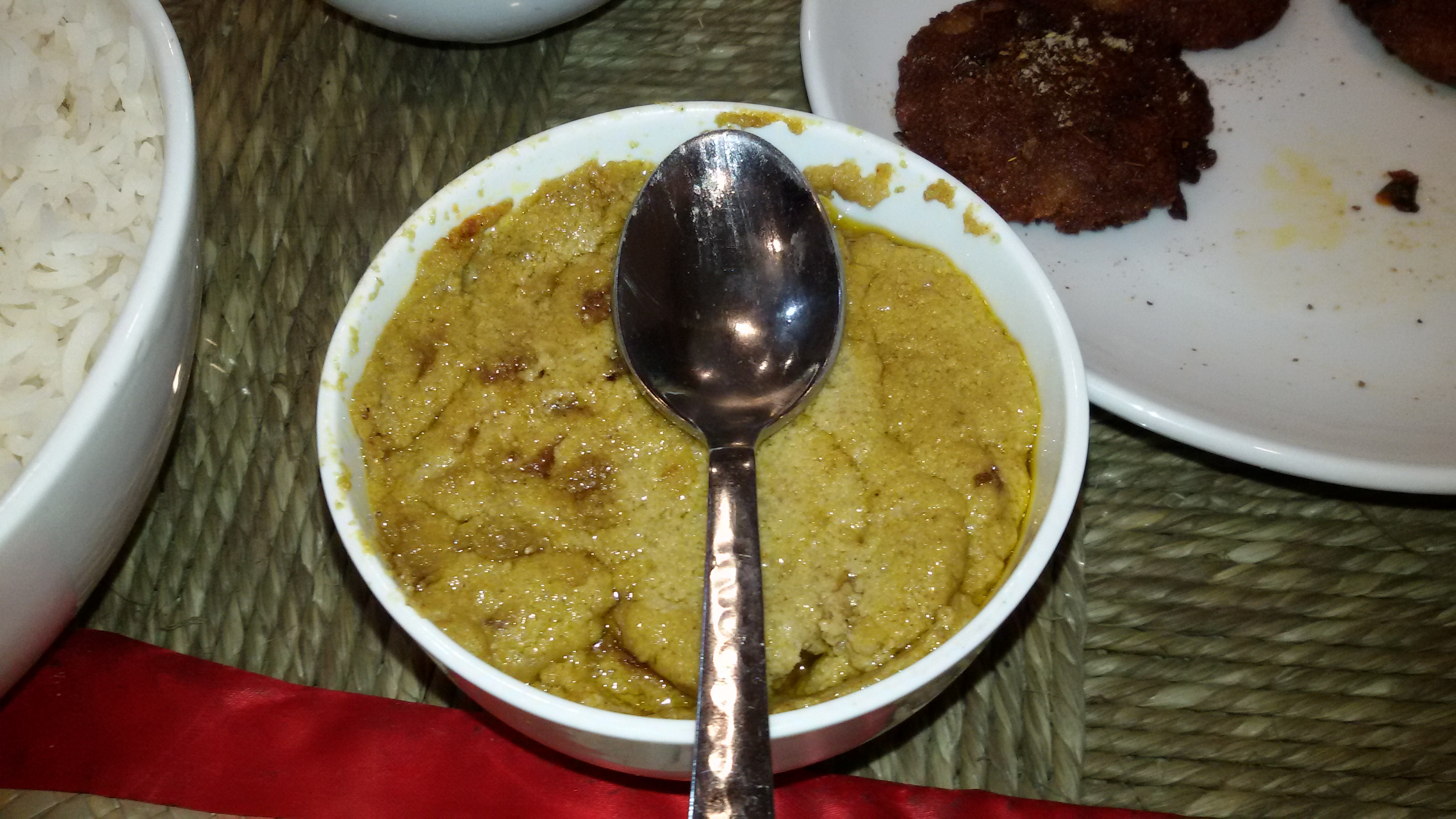
Bati posto from West Bengal

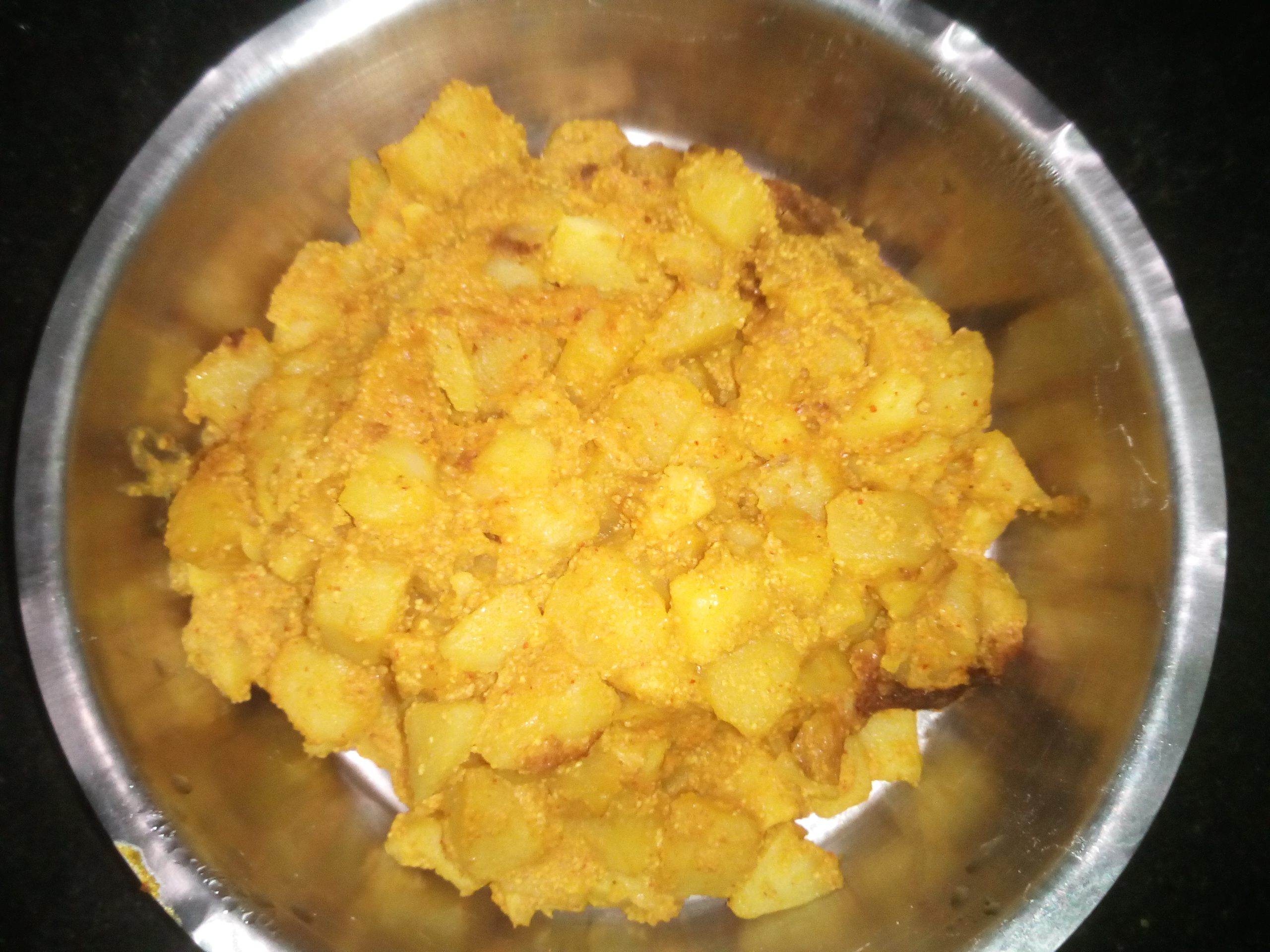
Aloo posto

In Indian cuisine, particularly Bengali cuisine, white poppy seeds are added for thickness, texture and flavor to recipes. Commonly used in the preparation of korma, ground poppy seeds, along with coconut and other spices, are combined into a paste added during cooking. Poppy seeds are widely used in many regional Indian cuisines. One dish, is aloo posto (potato and poppy seeds) which consists of ground poppy seeds cooked together with potatoes and made into a smooth, rich product, which is mainly eaten with rice. There are many variants to this basic dish, replacing or complementing the potatoes with other ingredients, such as onions (penyaj posto), pointed gourd (potol posto), Ridged Luffa (jhinge posto), chicken (murgi posto), and prawns (chingri posto). Chadachadi is another dish from Bengali cuisine and includes long strips of vegetables, sometimes with the stalks of leafy greens added, all lightly seasoned with spices like mustard or poppy seeds and flavored with a phoron. One dish involves grilling patties made from posto, sometimes frying them (postor bora). Another dish involves simply mixing uncooked ground poppy seeds (kancha posto) with mustard oil, chopped green chili peppers, fresh onions and rice. Kacha posto bata (uncooked poppy seeds paste) with mustard oil is a very popular dish in the region of Bengal. Poppy seeds are widely used in Kashmir as a topping on various breads, especially kulcha.

Poppy seeds, along with tulsi (basil) seeds, are added to beverages such as thandai, sharbat, milkshakes, rose milk, almond milk and khus khus milk.

=== Pakistani cuisine ===
Poppy seeds locally called "khashkhash" are an essential ingredient in the preparation of a dish that consists of minced meat balls locally called "Kofta".

== Health effects ==
Allergy (type 1 hypersensitivity) to poppy seeds is rare, but has been reported and can cause anaphylaxis.

=== False positive drug tests ===
Although the drug opium is produced by "milking" latex from the unripe fruits ("seed pods") rather than from the poppy seeds, all parts of the plant can contain or carry the opium alkaloids, especially morphine and codeine. This means that eating foods (e.g., bagels) that contain poppy seeds can result in a positive result for opiates in a drug test, although more refined tests can distinguish them. To minimize the problems caused by poppy seed consumption, the USADA recommends that athletes refrain from eating foods containing poppy seeds several days prior to a competitive event.

== Legal status ==
The sale of poppy seeds from Papaver somniferum is banned in Singapore because of the morphine content. Poppy seeds are also prohibited in Taiwan, primarily because of the risk that viable seeds will be sold and used to grow opium poppies.

China prohibits spice mixes made from poppy seed and poppy seed pods because of the traces of opiates in them, and has since at least 2005.

Despite its present use in Arab cuisine as a bread spice, poppy seeds are also banned in Saudi Arabia for drug control reasons.

=== International travelers ===
Travelers to the United Arab Emirates are especially prone to difficulties and severe punishments.

In Singapore, poppy seeds are classified as "prohibited goods" by the Central Narcotics Bureau (CNB).

== Gallery ==
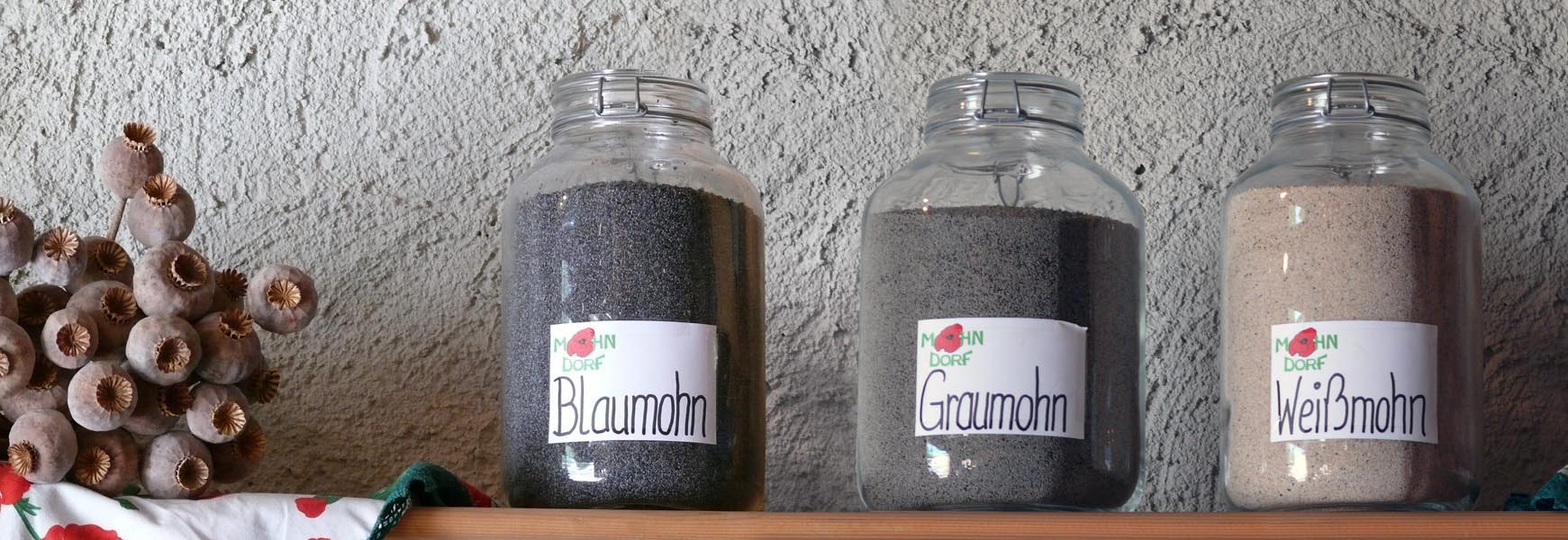
Dried poppy seed pods next to glass jars of blue, gray, and white poppy seeds used for pastries in Germany

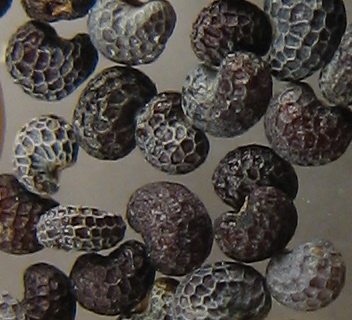
Macro photograph of poppy seeds

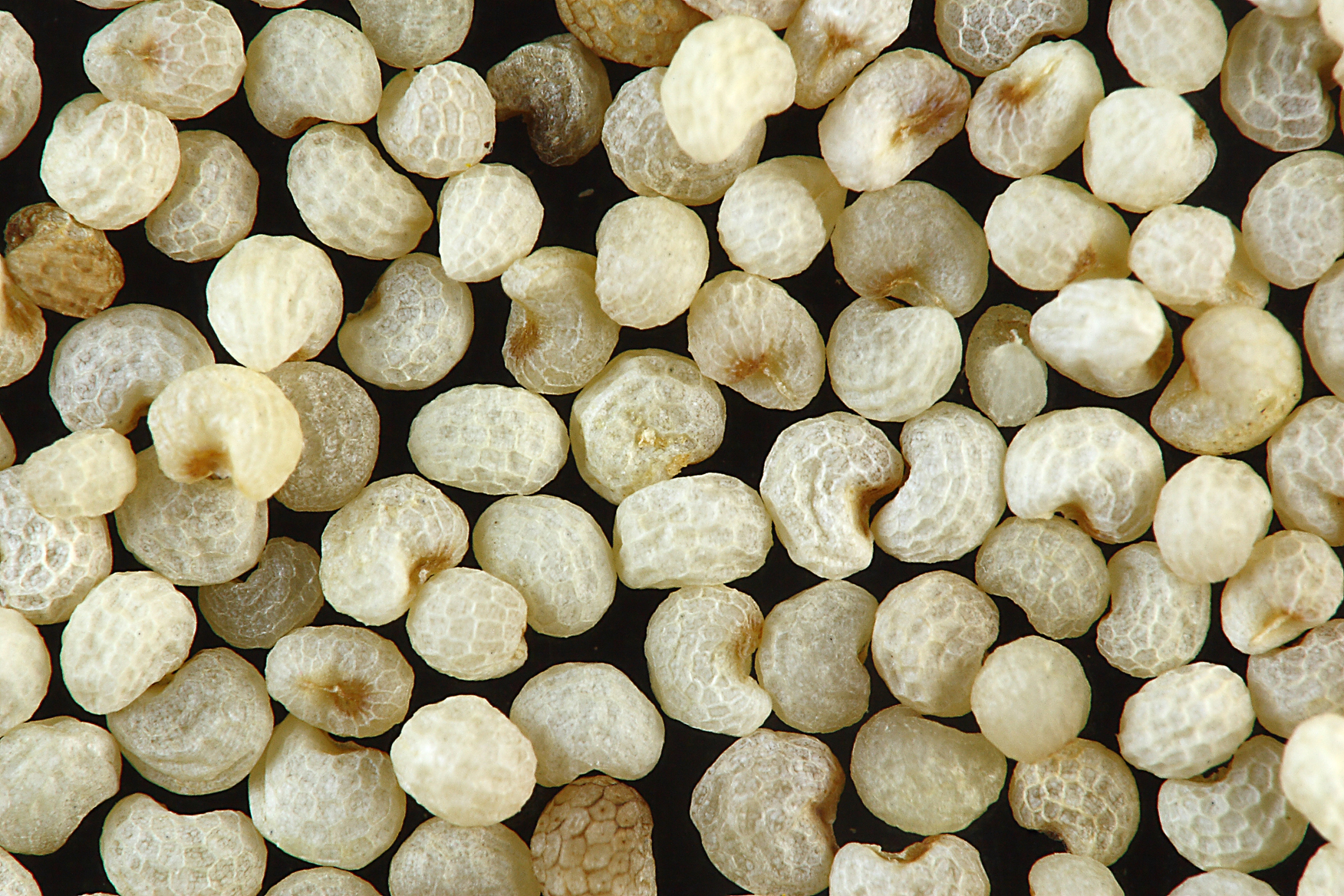
White poppy seeds, close up

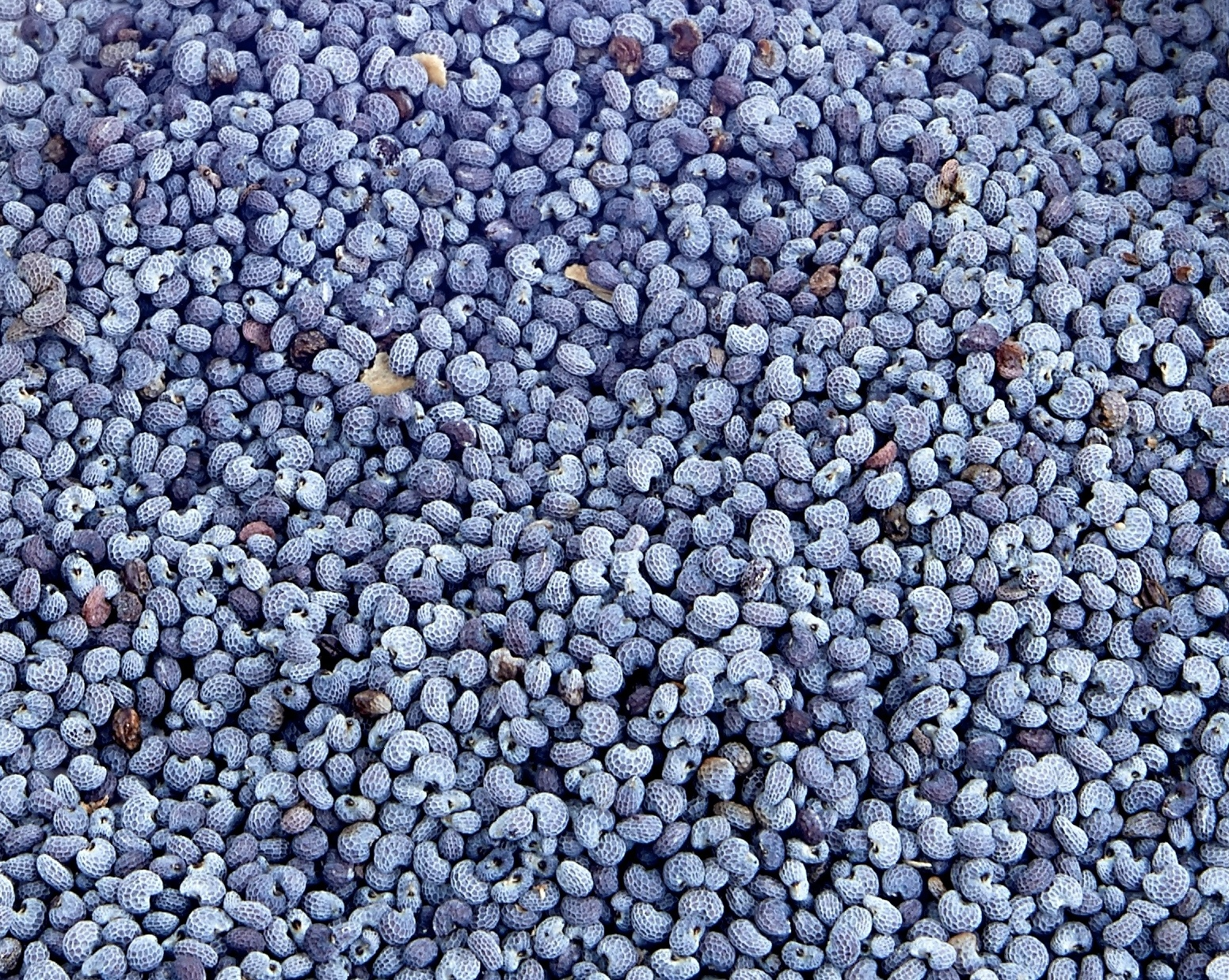
Czech blue poppy seeds (as food)

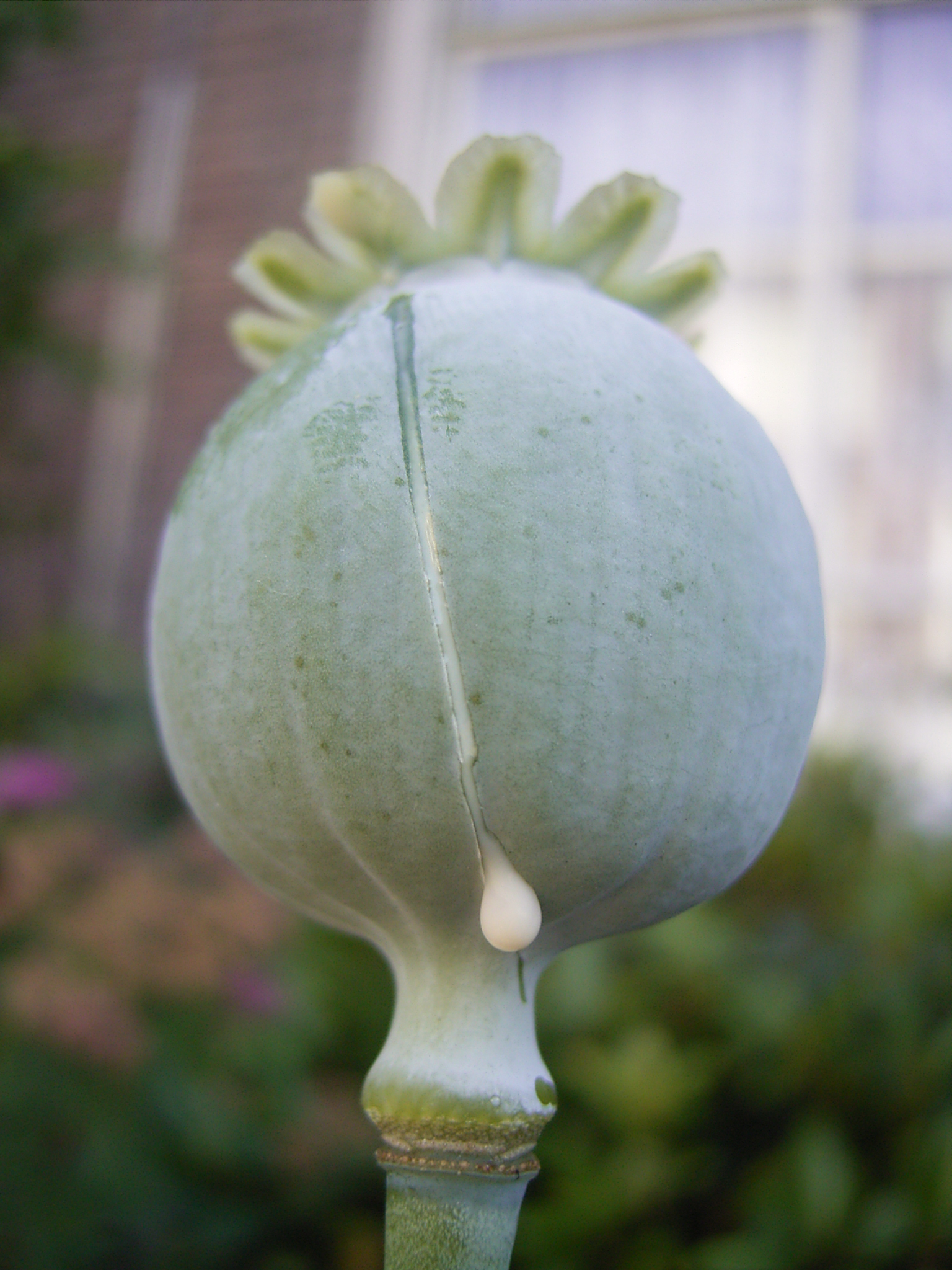
A cut green seed pod with fresh latex

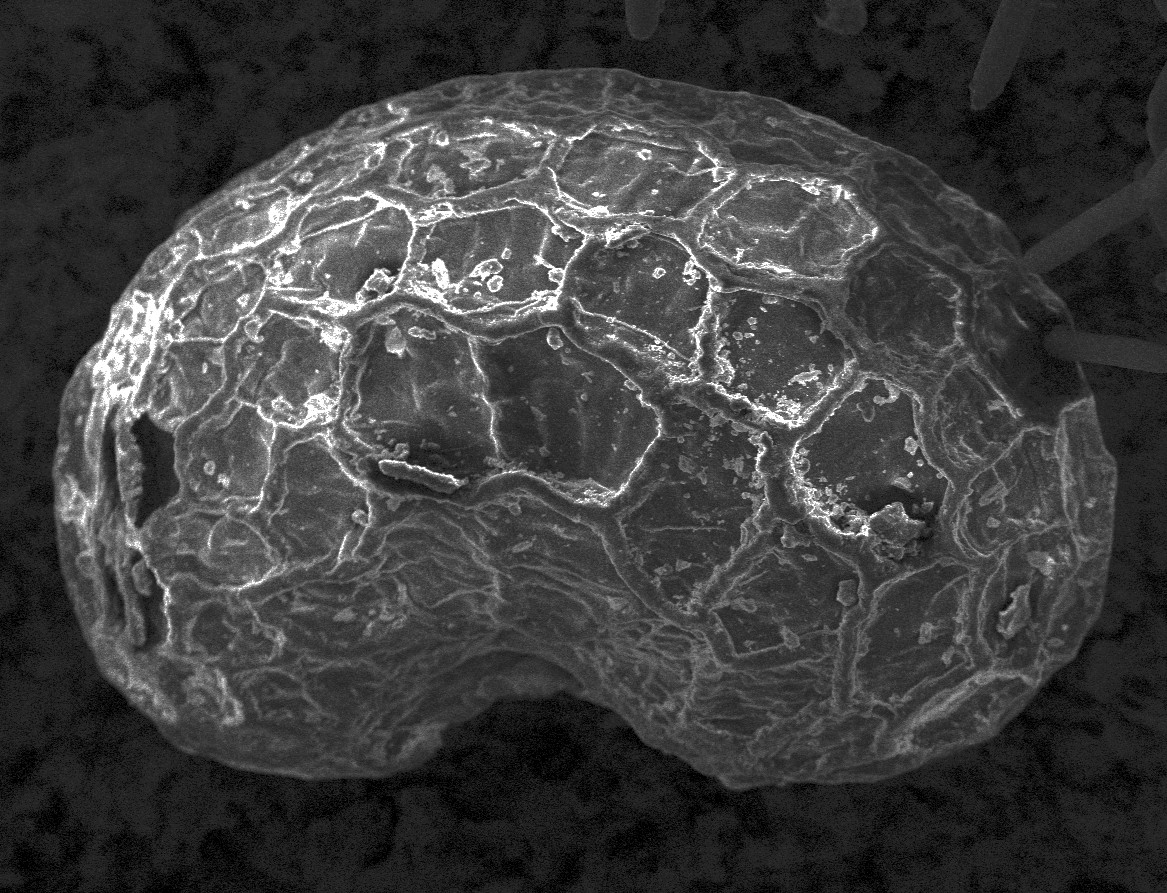
Electron micrograph of a poppy seed

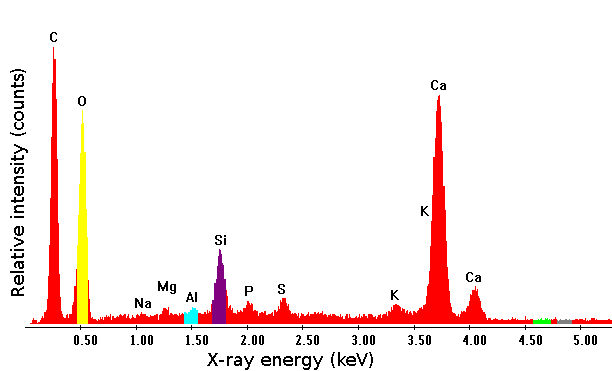
Energy-dispersive X-ray analysis showing high content of calcium and other mineral elements in the seed

== See also ==
- List of poppy seed pastries and dishes
