= Christmas Eve =

Evening or day before Christmas Day

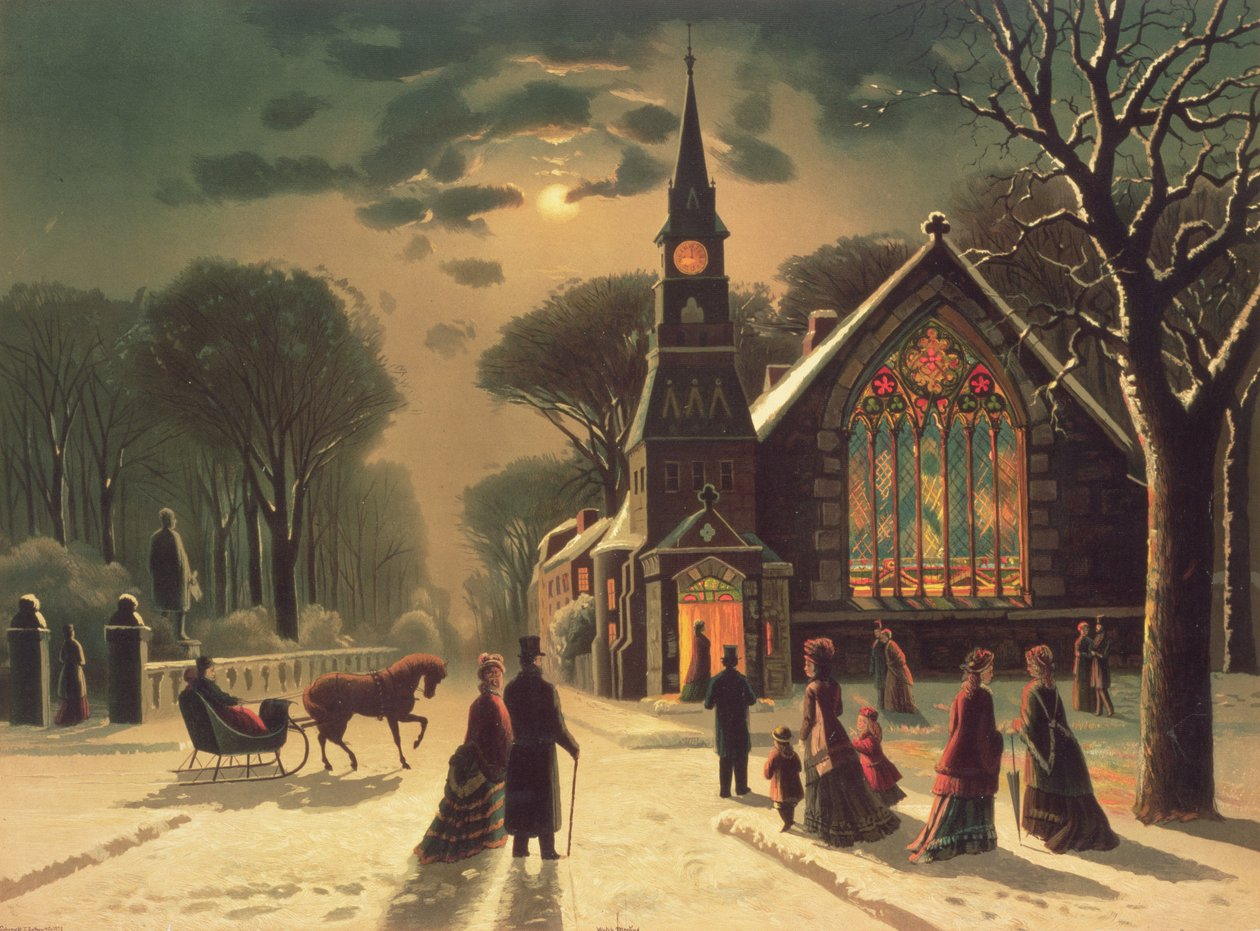
- Christmas Eve, an 1878 painting by J. Hoover & Son
- Also called: Vigil of the Nativity; Christmas Evening; Christmas Vigil; Day before Christmas; Night before Christmas
- Observed by: Christians; Many non-Christians
- Type: Christian, cultural
- Significance: Day or evening preceding the traditional birthday of Jesus
- Observances: Gift shopping, gift giving, goodwill greetings, Midnight Mass, other church services, meals, preparations for the arrival of Christmas gift-bringers, preparing for Christmas
- Date: 24 December (Western Churches and Eastern Orthodox churches that use the Revised Julian Calendar); 5 January (Armenian Apostolic Church); 6 January (Eastern Orthodox Churches that follow the Old Julian Calendar and most Oriental Orthodox Churches); 18 January (Armenian Patriarchate of Jerusalem)
- Frequency: Annual
- Related to: Christmas, Christmastide, New Year's Eve, New Year's Day

Christmas Eve is the evening or entire day before Christmas, the festival commemorating the birth of Jesus Christ. Christmas Eve is widely recognized as a full or partial holiday in anticipation of Christmas Day, which is observed around the world. Together, both days are considered one of the most culturally significant celebrations in Christendom and Western society.

Christmas celebrations in the denominations of Western Christianity have long begun on Christmas Eve, due in part to the Christian liturgical day starting at sunset, a practice inherited from Jewish tradition, and based on the story of Creation in the Book of Genesis: "And there was evening, and there was morning—the first day." Many churches still ring their church bells and hold prayers in the evening; for example, the Nordic Lutheran churches. Since tradition holds that Jesus was born at night (based in Luke 2:6-8), Midnight Mass is celebrated on Christmas Eve, traditionally at midnight, in commemoration of his birth. The idea of Jesus being born at night is reflected in the fact that Christmas Eve is referred to as Heilige Nacht (Holy Night) in German, Nochebuena (the Good Night) in Spanish and similarly in other expressions of Christmas spirituality, such as the song "Silent Night, Holy Night".

Many other varying cultural traditions and experiences are also associated with Christmas Eve around the world, including the gathering of family and friends, the singing of Christmas carols, the illumination and enjoyment of Christmas lights, trees, and other decorations, the wrapping, exchange and opening of gifts, and general preparation for Christmas Day. Legendary Christmas gift-bearing figures including Santa Claus, Father Christmas, Christkind, and Saint Nicholas are also often said to depart for their annual journey to deliver presents to children around the world on Christmas Eve, although until the Protestant introduction of Christkind in 16th-century Europe, such figures were said to instead deliver presents on the eve of Saint Nicholas' feast day (6 December).

== Religious traditions ==
=== Western churches ===
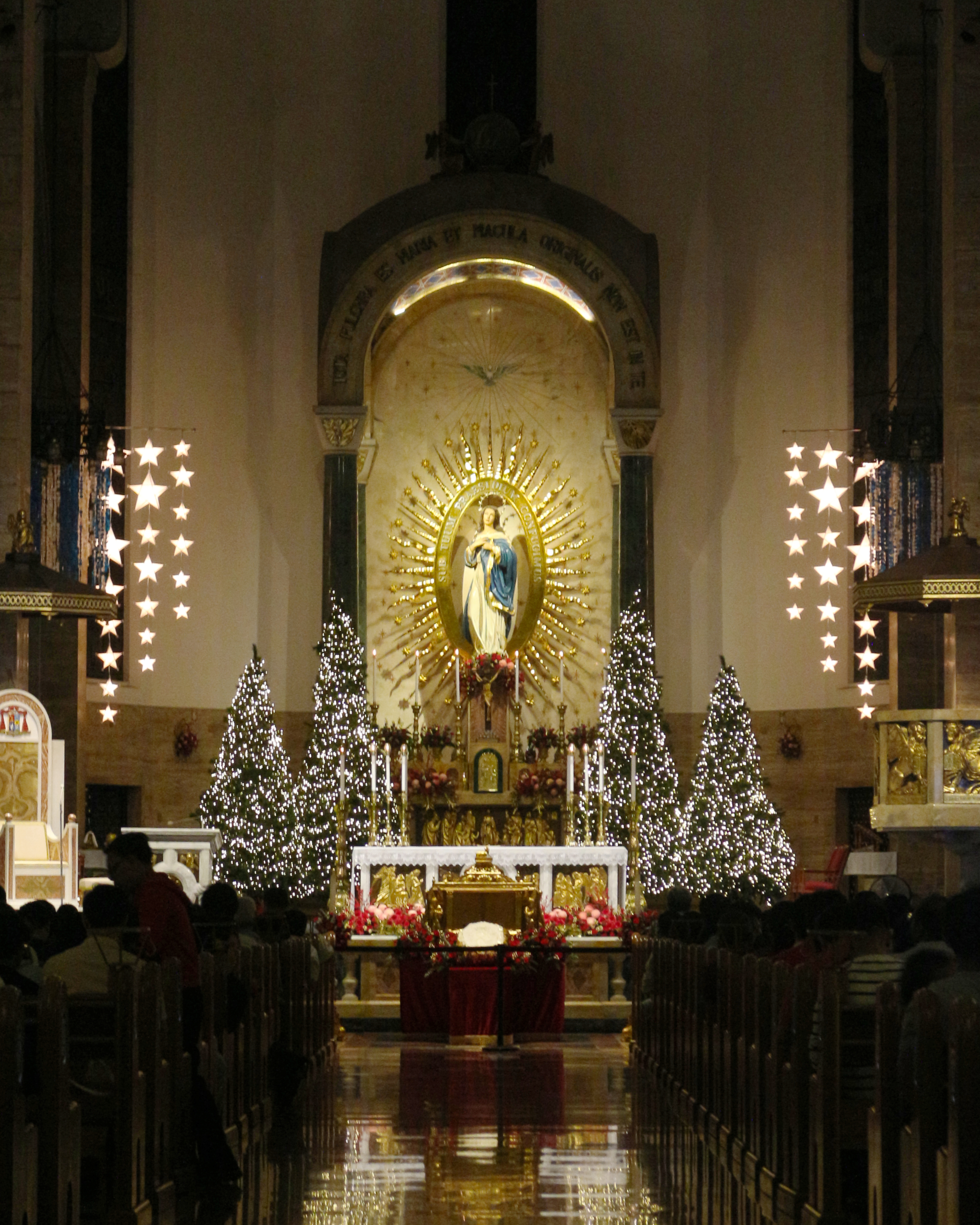
Midnight Mass is held in many churches toward the end of Christmas Eve, often with dim lighting and traditional decorative accents such as greenery.

Western churches have traditionally observed Christmas Eve (properly the Vigil of the Nativity) as a liturgical observance distinct from the masses of Christmas Day, with the proper Gospel at the Mass for the Vigil of the Nativity being that of the Annunciation to Joseph in Matthew 1. The Vigil of the Nativity is not so much the first day of Christmas as it is the last day of Advent, and so it traditionally retains the liturgical color of violet. In traditional western liturgical practice, when the Fourth Sunday of Advent and Christmas Eve occur on the same day, the Sunday mass is of Christmas Eve and the Fourth Sunday of Advent is only commemorated.

The festivities of Christmas Day have, however, extended farther and farther back into Christmas Eve. While Roman Catholics, Lutherans, and some Anglicans traditionally celebrate Midnight Mass, the first mass of Christmas, either at or near midnight on Christmas Eve, some churches have in recent decades scheduled their Midnight Mass as early as 7 pm in an effort to better accommodate young children, whose choral singing has become a popular feature in some traditions.

Midnight Mass is held in churches throughout the world and celebrates the birth of Christ, which is believed to have occurred at night. Midnight Mass is popular in Poland (pasterka) and Lithuania (piemenėlių mišios). In Latin America and the Iberian Peninsula, the Midnight Mass is also referred to as "Rooster's Mass" (Misa de Gallo in Spanish, Missa do Galo in Portuguese and Missa del Gall in Catalan). In the Philippines, the custom has expanded into the nine-day Simbang Gabi, when Filipinos attend dawn Masses (traditionally beginning around 4 to 5 am PST) from 16 December on until Christmas Eve. In 2009 Vatican officials scheduled the Midnight Mass to start at 10 pm so that the 82-year-old Pope Benedict XVI would not have too late a night.

A nativity scene may be erected indoors or outdoors, and is composed of figurines depicting the infant Jesus resting in a manger, Mary, and Joseph. Other figures in the scene may include angels, shepherds, and various animals. The figures may be made of any material, and arranged in a stable or grotto. The Magi may also appear, and are sometimes not placed in the scene until the week following Christmas to account for their travel time to Bethlehem. While most home nativity scenes are packed away at Christmas or shortly thereafter, nativity scenes in churches usually remain on display until the feast of the Baptism of the Lord.

Throughout congregations of the various denominations of Christianity, on Christmas Eve, the Christ Candle in the center of the Advent wreath is traditionally lit in many church services. In candlelight services, while singing Silent Night, each member of the congregation receives a candle and passes along their flame which is first received from the Christ Candle.

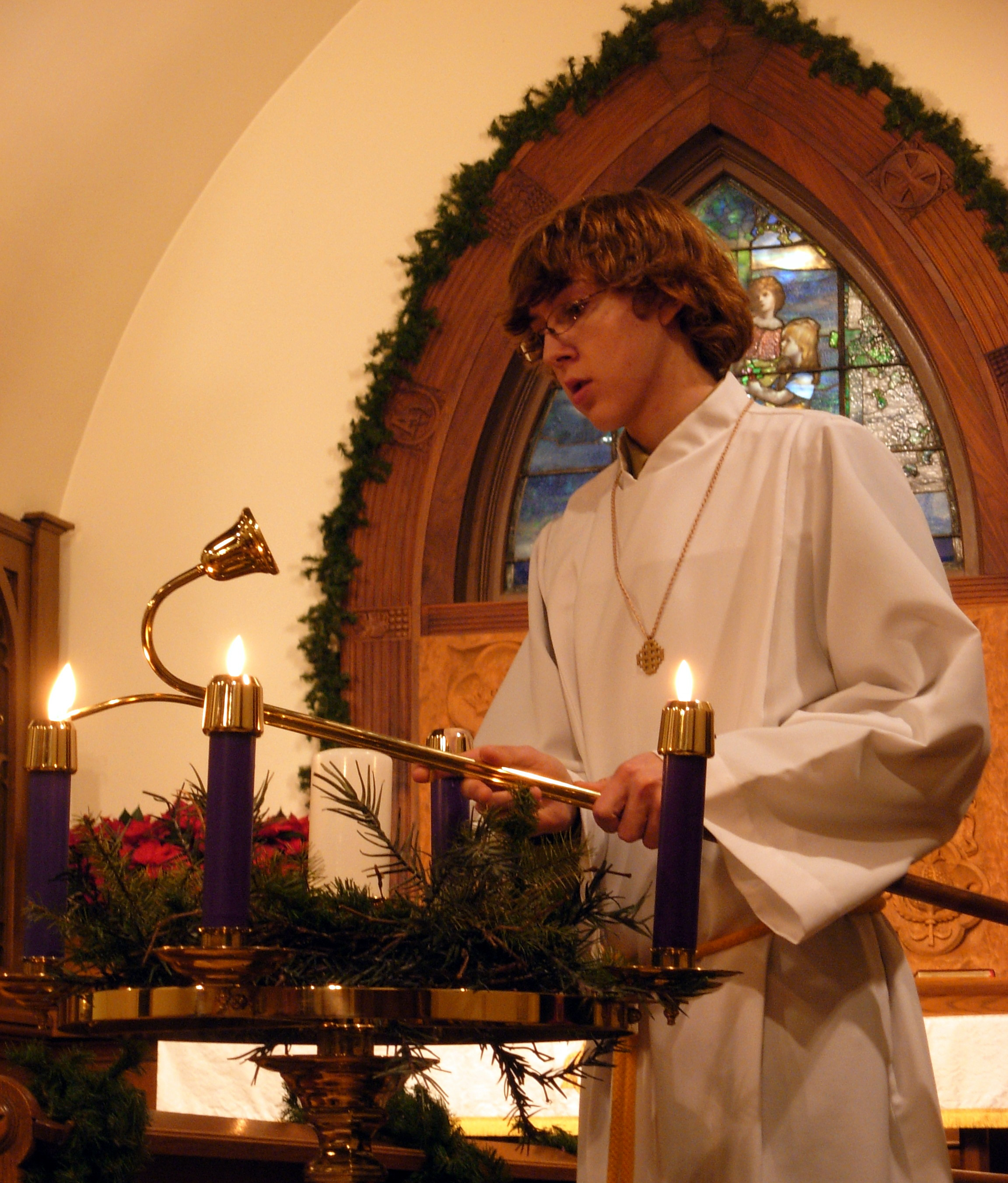
Advent wreath, lighting the candle

Lutherans traditionally practice Christmas Eve Eucharistic traditions typical of Germany and Scandinavia. "Krippenspiele" (Nativity plays), special festive music for organ, vocal and brass choirs and candlelight services make Christmas Eve one of the most beloved days in the Lutheran Church calendar. Christmas Vespers is popular in the early evening, and Midnight Masses are also widespread in regions which are predominantly Lutheran. The old Lutheran tradition of a Christmas Vigil in the early morning hours of Christmas Day (Christmette) can still be found in some regions. In eastern and middle Germany, congregations still continue the tradition of "Quempas singing": separate groups dispersed in various parts of the church sing verses of the song "He whom shepherds once came Praising" (Quem pastores laudavere) responsively.

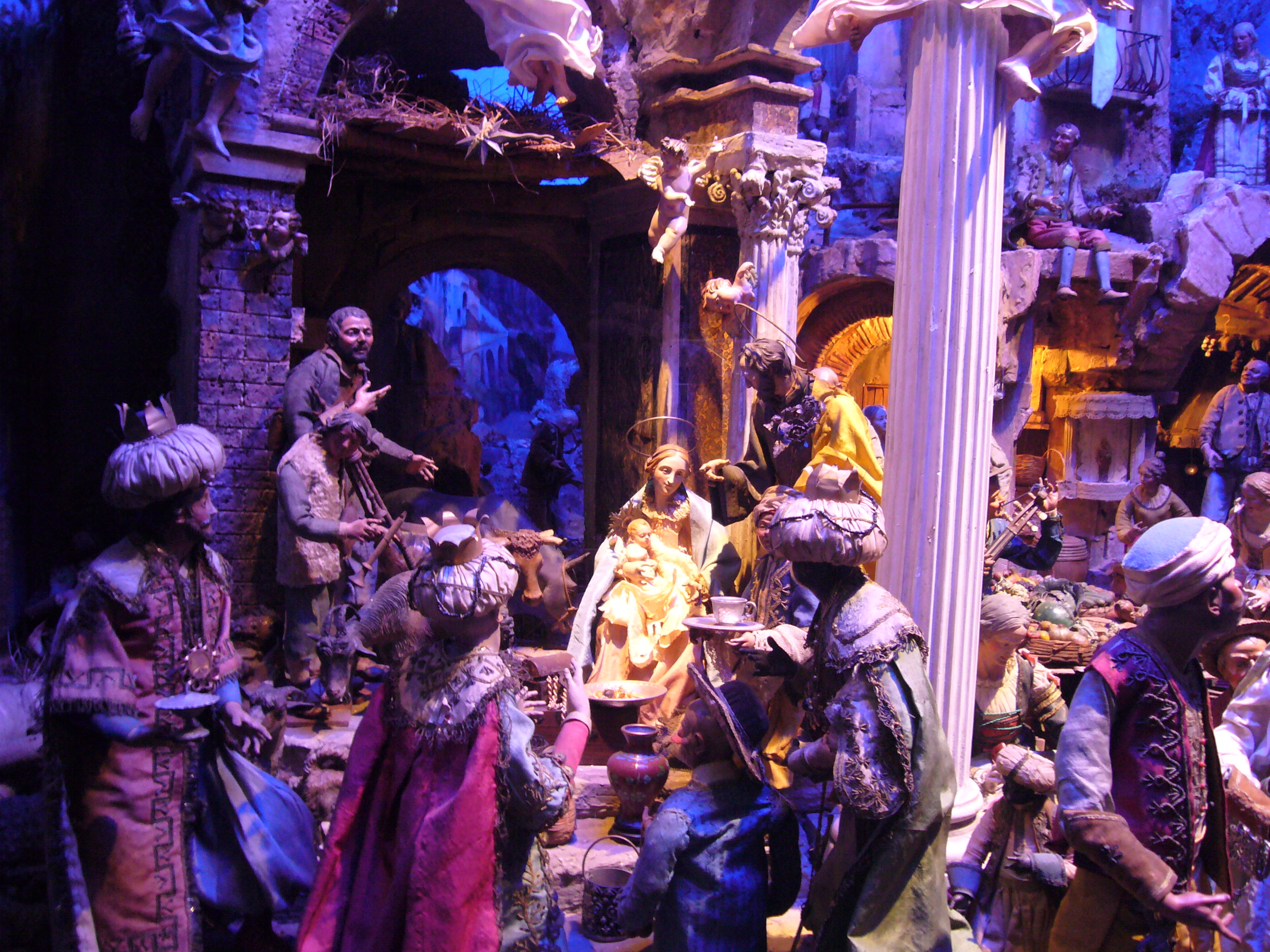
Typical Neapolitan nativity scene, or presepe or presepio, in Rome.

With respect to Presbyterianism, the Church of Scotland has a service beginning just before midnight, in which carols are sung. These services are very popular.

Methodists celebrate the evening in different ways. Some, in the early evening, come to their church to celebrate Holy Communion with their families. The mood is very solemn, and the only visible light is the Advent Wreath, and the candles upon the Lord's Table. Others celebrate the evening with services of light, which include singing the song Silent Night as a variety of candles (including personal candles) are lit. Other churches have late evening services perhaps at 11 pm, so that the church can celebrate Christmas Day together with the ringing of bells at midnight. Others offer Christmas Day services as well.

The annual "Nine Lessons and Carols", broadcast from King's College, Cambridge on Christmas Eve, has established itself a Christmas custom in the United Kingdom, where Anglican Christianity is the traditional faith. It is broadcast outside the UK via the BBC World Service, and is also bought by broadcasters around the world.

=== Eastern churches ===
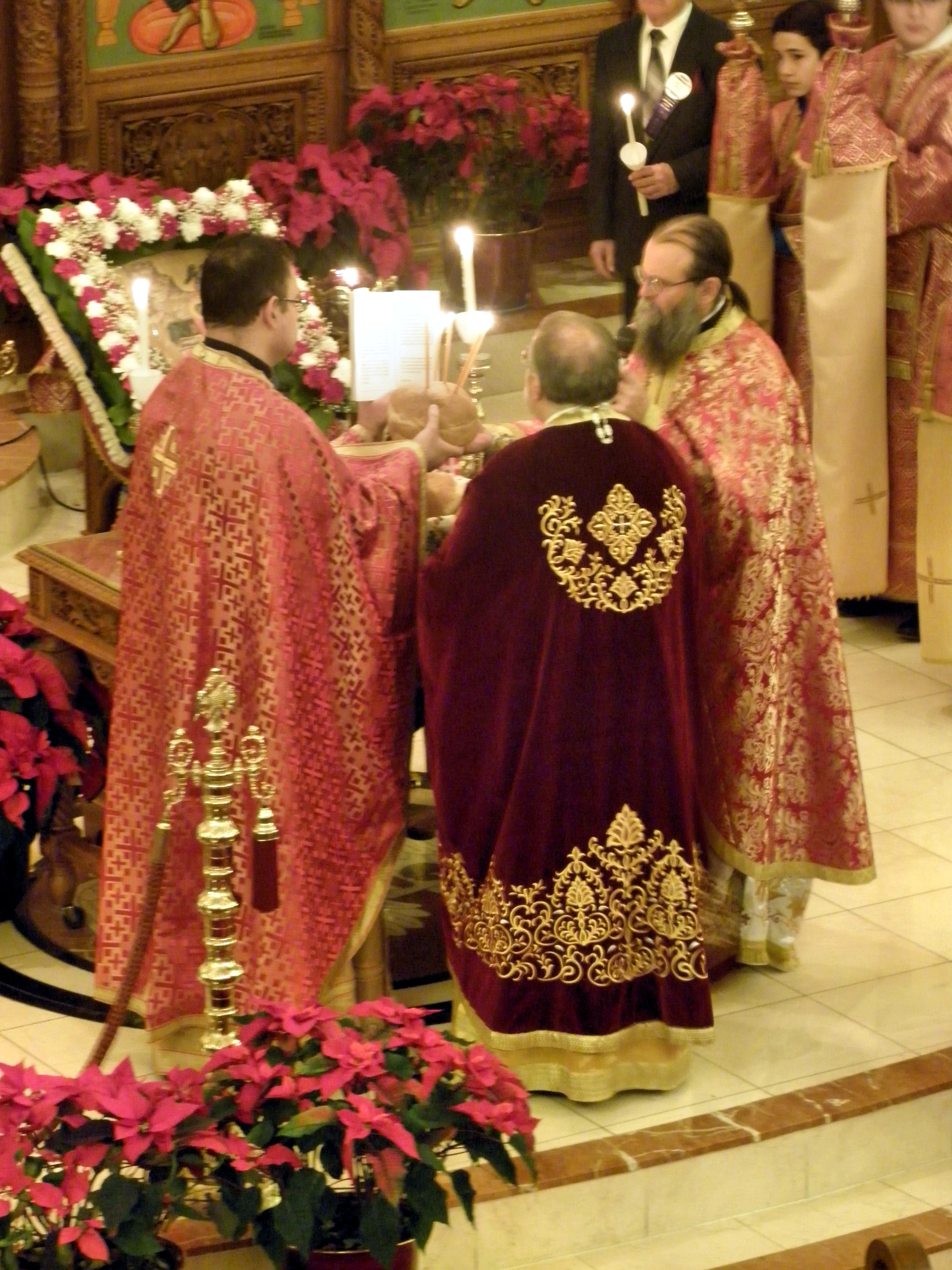
Annunciation of the Virgin Mary Greek Orthodox Cathedral, Toronto, Ontario, Canada

In the Byzantine Rite, Christmas Eve is referred to as Paramony ("preparation"). It is the concluding day of the Nativity Fast and is observed as a day of strict fasting by those devout Byzantine Christians who are physically capable of doing so. In some traditions, nothing is eaten until the first star appears in the evening sky, in commemoration of the Star of Bethlehem. The liturgical celebration begins earlier in the day with the celebration of the Royal Hours, followed by the Divine Liturgy combined with the celebration of Vespers, during which a large number of passages from the Old Testament are chanted, recounting the history of salvation. After the dismissal at the end of the service, a new candle is brought out into the center of the church and lit, and all gather round and sing the Troparion and Kontakion of the Feast.

In the evening, the All-Night Vigil for the Feast of the Nativity is composed of Great Compline, Matins and the First Hour. The Byzantine services of Christmas Eve are intentionally parallel to those of Good Friday, illustrating the theological point that the purpose of the Incarnation was to make possible the Crucifixion and Resurrection. This is illustrated in Eastern icons of the Nativity, on which the Christ Child is wrapped in swaddling clothes reminiscent of his burial wrappings. The child is also shown lying on a stone, representing the Tomb of Christ, rather than a manger. The Cave of the Nativity is also a reminder of the cave in which Jesus was buried.

The services of Christmas Eve are also similar to those of the Eve of Theophany (Epiphany), and the two Great Feasts are considered one celebration.

In some Orthodox cultures, after the Vesperal Liturgy the family returns home to a festive meal, but one at which Orthodox fasting rules are still observed: no meat or dairy products (milk, cheese, eggs, etc.) are consumed (see below for variations according to nationality). Then they return to the church for the All-Night Vigil.

The next morning, Christmas Day, the Divine Liturgy is celebrated again, but with special features that occur only on Great Feasts of the Lord. After the dismissal of this Liturgy, the faithful customarily greet each other with the kiss of peace and the words: "Christ is Born!", to which the one being greeted responds: "Glorify Him!" (the opening words of the Canon of the Nativity that was chanted the night before during the Vigil). This greeting, together with many of the hymns of the feast, continue to be used until the leave-taking of the feast on 31 December.

The first three days of the feast are particularly solemn. The second day is known as the Synaxis of the Theotokos, and commemorates the role of the Virgin Mary in the Nativity of Jesus. The third day is referred to simply as "the Third Day of the Nativity". The Saturday and Sunday following 25 December have special Epistle and Gospel readings assigned to them. 29 December celebrates the Holy Innocents.

Byzantine Christians observe a festal period of twelve days, during which no one in the Church fasts, even on Wednesdays and Fridays, which are normal fasting days throughout the rest of the year. During this time one feast leads into another: 25–31 December is the afterfeast of the Nativity; 2–5 January is the forefeast of the Epiphany.

== Christmas Eve dinner ==
=== Bulgaria ===
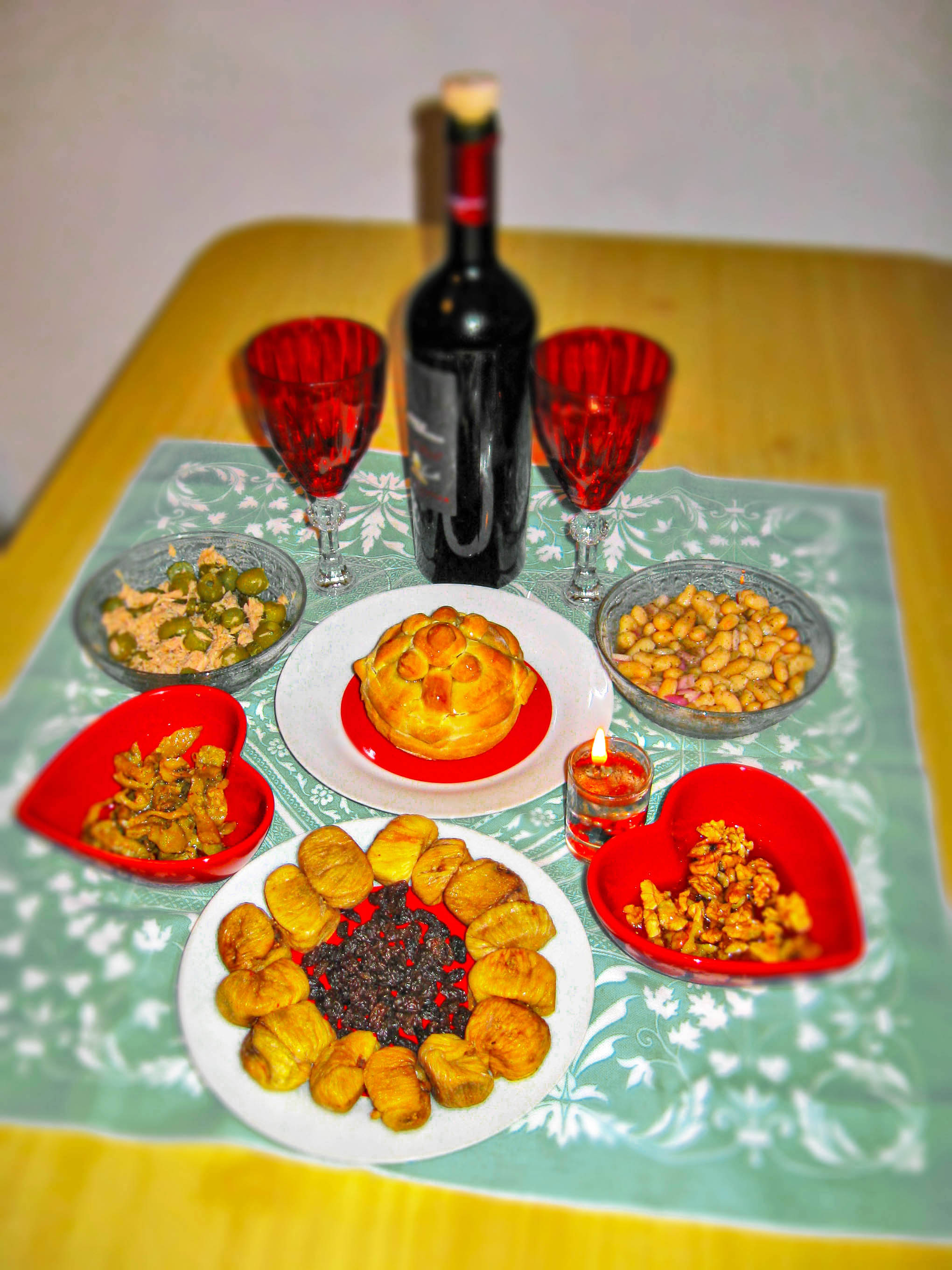
Seven traditional Christmas Eve dishes from Bulgaria (2014)

In Bulgaria, the meal consists of an odd number of lenten dishes in compliance with the rules of fasting. They are usually the traditional sarma, bob chorba (bean soup), fortune kravai (pastry with a fortune in it; also called bogovitsa, vechernik, kolednik), stuffed peppers, nuts, dried fruit, boiled wheat. The meal is often accompanied with wine or Bulgaria's traditional alcoholic beverage rakia, in the past olovina (a type of homemade rye beer). The meals used to be put on top of hay, directly on the floor, together with a ploughshare or a coulter.

=== Cuba ===
In Cuba, roasted pig (lechón) is often the center of Christmas Eve (Nochebuena). It is believed that the tradition dates back to the 15th century when Caribbean colonists hunted down pigs and roasted them with a powerful flame.

In Cuban and Cuban-American tradition, the pig is sometimes cooked in a Caja China, a large box where an entire pig is placed below hot coals. The dinner features many side dishes and desserts, and often games of dominoes are played. The tradition is continued by Cuban families in the United States. The dinner on Christmas Eve is the center of the celebration.

Christmas Eve dinner is generally not served at a set time, though it is typically eaten as a family. It is expected that the entire family will be at the table to start tasting the frijoles negros dormidos (sleeping black beans) and the arroz blanco desgranado y reluciente (shredded white rice), the yuca con mojo (a Cuban side dish made by marinating cassava in garlic, sour orange, and olive oil), the roasted pork or the stuffed or unfilled guanajo, along with homemade desserts, such as Christmas fritters, and a wide range of sweets in syrup and Spanish nougat.

The visit to the archipelago of Pope John Paul II, in 1998, prompted the Cuban government, in a gesture of goodwill, to declare 25 December again as a holiday, which it had not been for several decades.

=== Czech Republic and Slovakia ===
In the Czech Republic and Slovakia, fasting on the day of Christmas Eve (or only eating meatless food) is a medieval tradition. The belief is that if one lasted until Christmas dinner, they would see a golden pig, which is a symbol of luck. A typical Christmas breakfast is a sweet braided bread vánočka. Christmas Eve dinner traditionally consists of a carp (baked or fried) and a potato salad.

=== France ===
In French-speaking places, Réveillon is a long dinner eaten on Christmas Eve.

=== Guam and the Northern Marianas ===
In Guam and the Northern Marianas, dishes include shrimp kelaguen; coconut crab; and kadon octopus (octopus stewed in sweet peppers and coconut milk). Beef is a rarity, but a popular dish is tinaktak, ground beef in coconut milk.

=== Germany ===
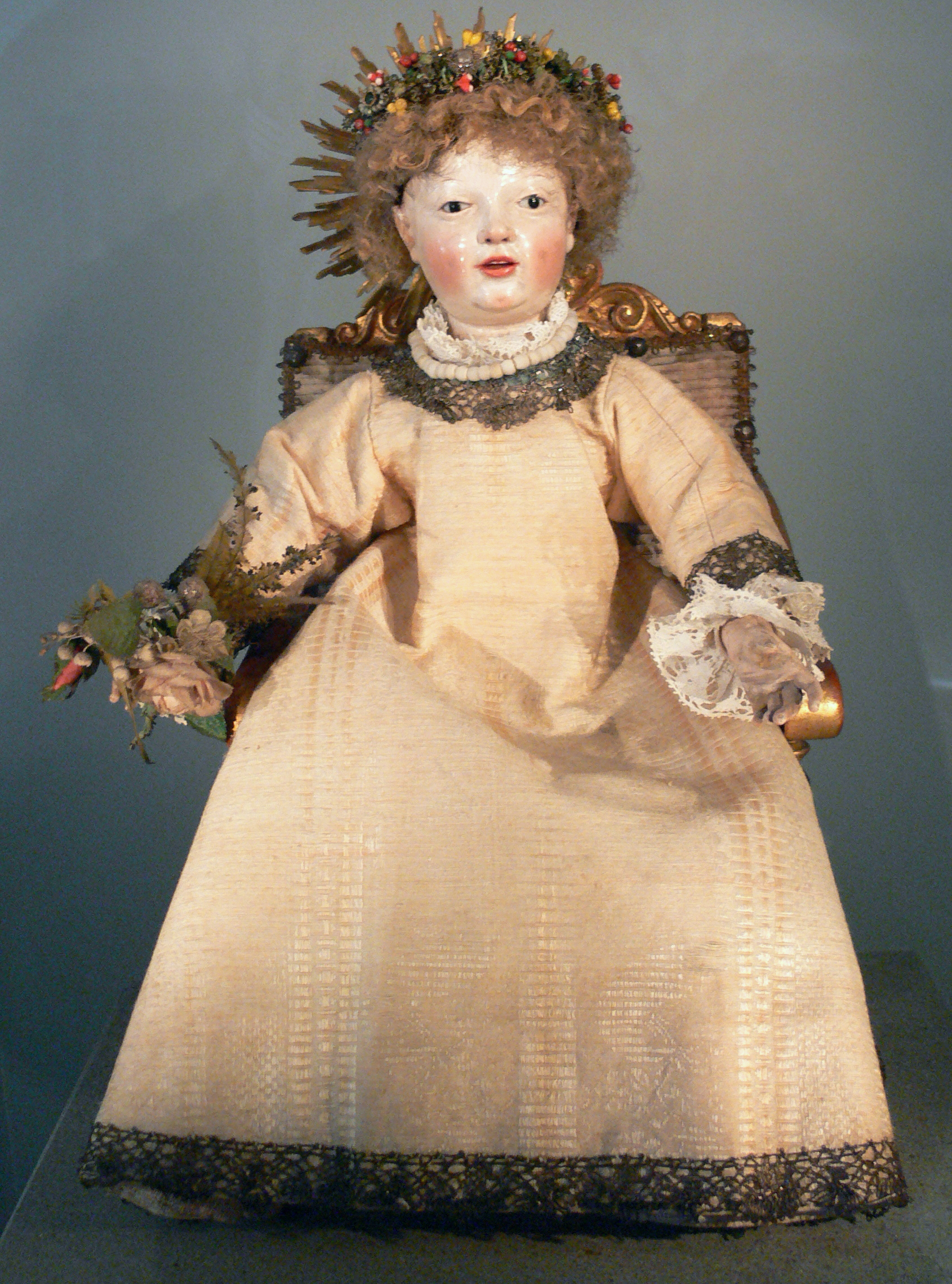
Christkind

During the Christmas period, the Weihnachtsmarkt (Christmas market) becomes a feature of almost every city, town, or village in the German-speaking countries, where visitors enjoy stalls, entertainment, and savour food and Glühwein (mulled wine). Traditional Christmastime treats include Lebkuchen (gingerbread), Stollen (fruit cake), Speculaas and marzipan (almond confectionery often made into sweets). Perhaps the most famed of these markets is the Christkindlesmarkt held in Nuremberg, which attracts millions of visitors every year.

The Weihnachtsbaum (Christmas tree) is usually put up on the afternoon of 24 December. The trees can be bought at special traders' sites, but some families may still go into the forest and cut one themselves. The Christkind brings the presents on the evening of Christmas eve.

Traditionally, on Heiligabend (Christmas Eve) in Germany, a simple meal will be prepared and served before or after the Bescherung ("time for exchanging gifts"), in contrast to the big meal on Christmas Day. Various polls repeatedly declare (Eintopf) or sausages (Würstchen) with potato salad to be Germany's favourite meal on Heiligabend. Further typical meals may include carp, fondue or raclette. On Christmas Day, the most common dishes are roast goose or duck.

=== Italy ===
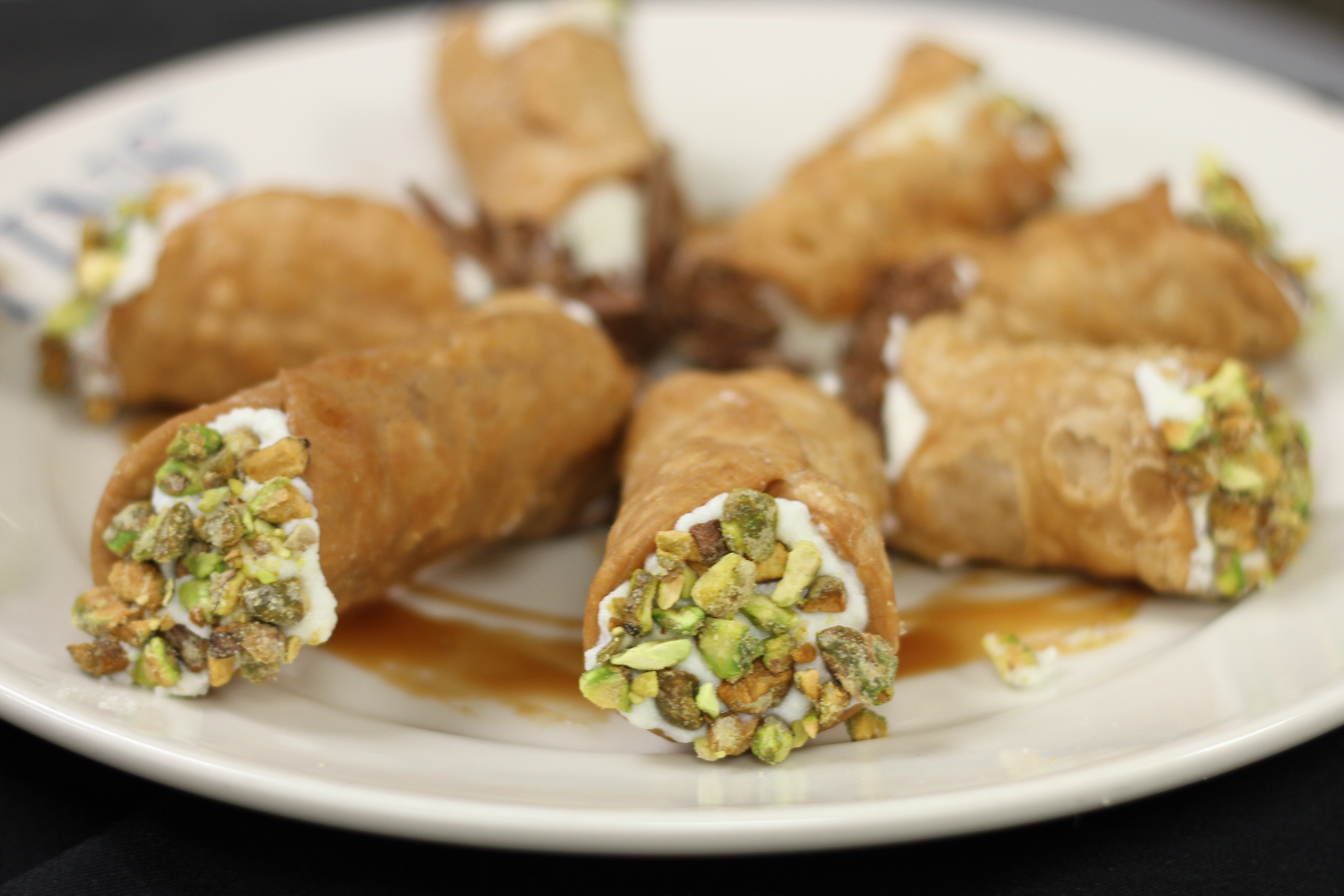
Cannoli served at the Feast of the Seven Fishes

Christmas in Italy is one of the country's major holidays and begins on 8 December, with the Feast of the Immaculate Conception, the day on which traditionally the Christmas tree is put up, and ends on 6 January of the following year with the Epiphany. According to tradition, the Christmas Eve dinner must not contain meat. It is quite common to attend Midnight Mass on Christmas Eve and practice the old custom of abstinence from meat on the day (but not fasting, which is observed by the Eastern Orthodox Church). Traditions regarding the exchanging of gifts vary from region to region, as this may take place either on Christmas Eve or on Christmas Day. On 24 December, Christmas Eve, the Christmas night mass, also called Midnight Mass, is celebrated.

While other Christian families throughout the world celebrate the Christmas Eve meal with various meats, Italians (especially Sicilians) celebrate the traditional Catholic "Feast of the Seven Fishes" which was historically served after a 24-hour fasting period. Although Christmas fasting is no longer a popular custom, some Italian-Americans still enjoy a meatless Christmas Eve feast and attend the Midnight Mass. In various cultures, a festive dinner is traditionally served for the family and close friends in attendance, when the first star (usually Sirius) appears in the sky.

=== Lithuania ===
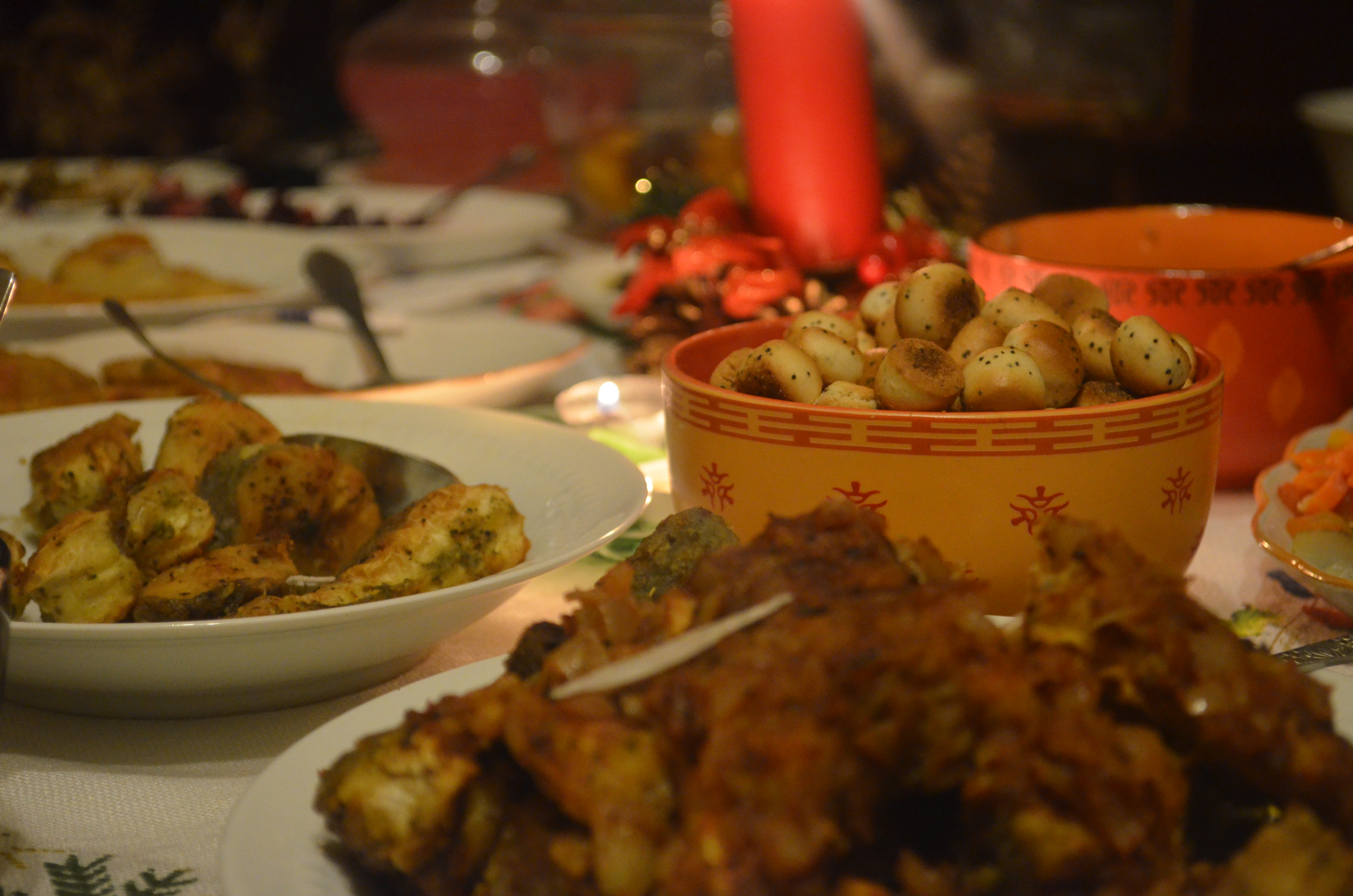
Lithuanian Christmas Eve table with kūčiukai

Lithuanian Christmas Eve blends pagan and Christian traditions, as initially it was a celebration of the winter solstice. Traditionally, Lithuanians believed that animals could talk on that night, and it was possible to predict the future with charms and various games. Kūčios ("Holy Meal") is the most important event of the year and family reunion. Dead relatives are remembered with an empty plate set at the table. The feast starts after the rise of the evening star. No products made from meat, milk and alcohol are allowed during the Kūčios. In all, 12 dishes are served, all of them rustic, made from grains, fish, dried fruit or mushrooms including kūčiukai. Small biscuits soaked in poppy seed milk are served. After the dinner is over the table is left uncleared overnight for the feast of vėlės (spirits or soul).

=== Peru ===
In Peru, turkey and panettone are the stars of Christmas Eve.

=== Philippines ===
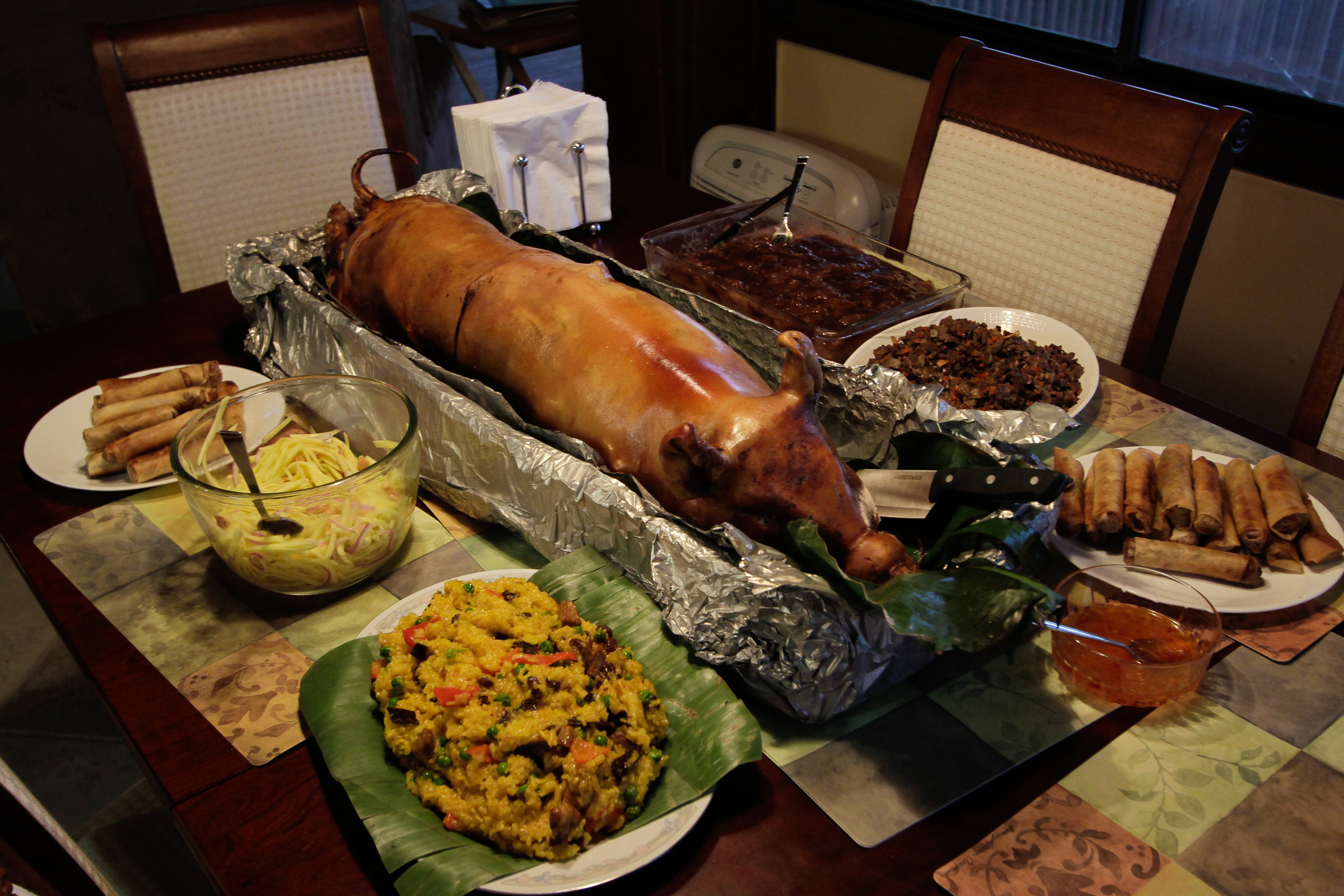
Typical traditional Nochebuena meal in the Philippines, with a lechón as the centerpiece

In the Philippines, the traditional dinner (known as nochebuena) is served at midnight after the family attends the late evening Mass known as Misa de Gallo (sometimes referred to as Misa de Aguinaldo, "Gift Mass"). Common traditional dishes served for the main course include: lechón, various types of pancit (noodles), Filipino spaghetti, hamonado, jamón, queso de bola, morcón, embutido, chicken galantina, almondigas (meatballs), paelya (arroz valenciana, bringhe, etc.), lumpia, menudo, mechado, caldereta, callos, chicken pastel, relyenong bangús (stuffed milkfish), lengua estofado, adobo, and various types of barbecue (inihaw). Almost all of these dishes are eaten with white rice. Desserts and side dishes include úbe halayá, turon, leche flan, macaroni salad, membrilyo, fruit salad, buko salad, crema de fruta, ensaymada, champorado, mango float, fruitcake, castañas (roasted chestnuts), and various other kakanin (rice cakes) like puto bumbong, bibingka, suman, biko, and sapin-sapin. Popular beverages are tsokolate as well as coffee, soda, wine, beer, alcoholic drinks, and fruit juices.

=== Poland ===
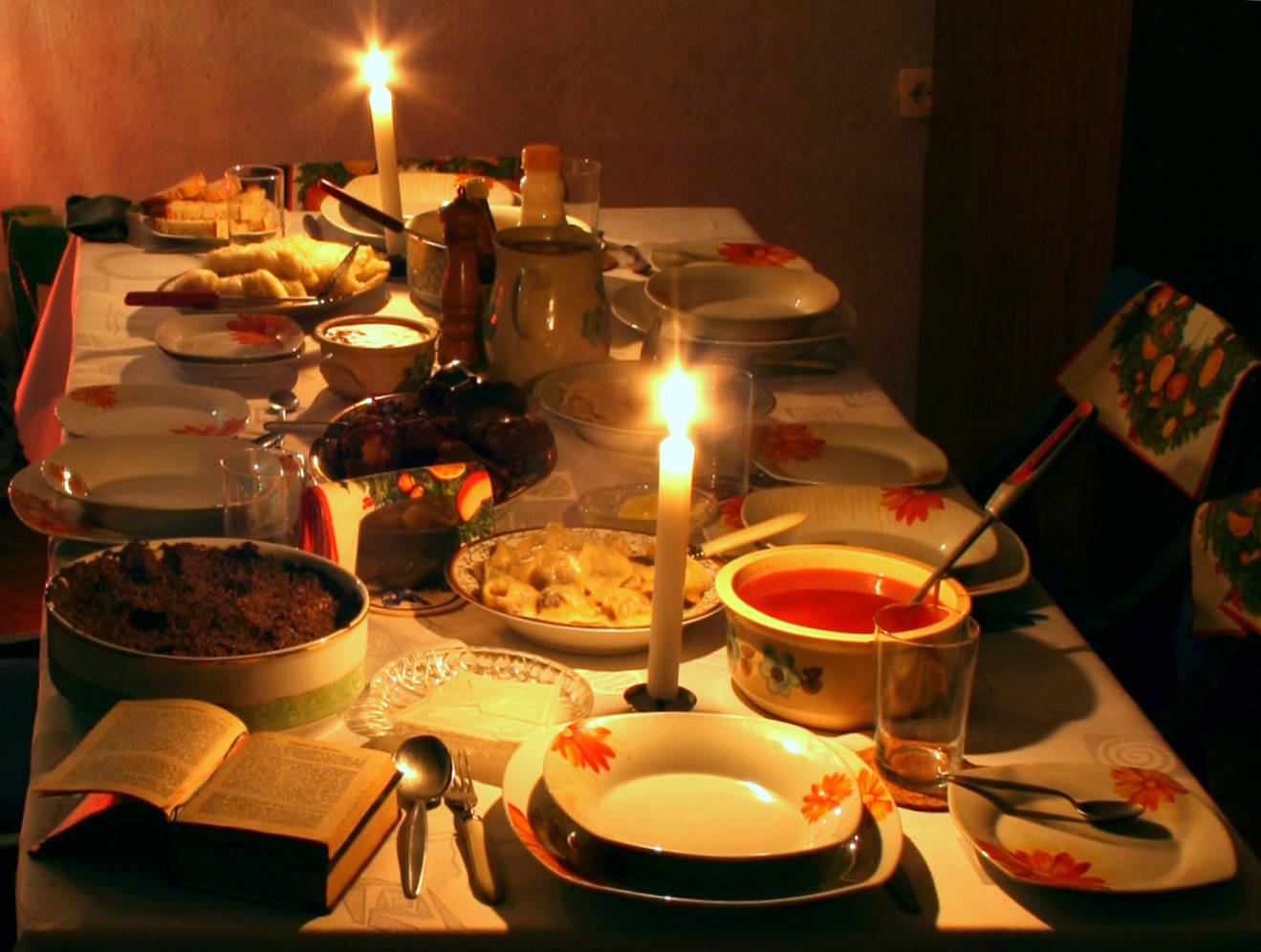
Traditional Polish Wigilia meal

Christmas Eve is the most eventful day of the Christmastide in Poland, and is characterized by the vigil supper called Wigilia held across the country. All dishes served are meatless and their number is traditionally 12, but has been an odd number in the past. According to the Etymological Dictionary of the Polish Language by Aleksander Brückner, the number of dishes was traditionally related to social class: the peasants' vigil consisted of 5 or 7 dishes, the gentry usually served 9, and the aristocracy, 11 dishes, but the even number 12 is also found today to remember the Twelve Apostles. It is obligatory to try a portion of all of them. Some traditions specify that the number of guests cannot be odd.. The Christmas Eve dinner has its roots in pagan Shchedry Vody, the winter solstice festival aimed at ensuring prosperity for the coming year. Sharing the wafer is a gesture of reconciliation and forgiveness that comes from Christian tradition. This custom appeared in Poland in the 18th century and quickly became one of the most moving moments of the holidays..

=== Puerto Rico ===
In the U.S. territory of Puerto Rico, the traditional Christmas Eve dinner consists of arroz con gandules (rice with pigeon peas), lechón asado (pig roast) or pernil asado (pork roast shoulder), morcilla (rice-filled pork blood sausage), pasteles (root vegetable-based dough, meat-filled tamale), guineitos en escabeche (marinated, sliced green bananas), ensalada de papa puertorriqueña (Puerto Rican potato salad), and ensalada de coditos puertorriqueña (Puerto Rican macaroni salad). The traditional Christmas Eve desserts are arroz con dulce (coconut rice pudding), tembleque (coconut pudding), flan de queso o coco (cheese or coconut caramel custard), tierrita (chocolate mousse), turrón, galletas florecitas (small meringue-topped biscuits), Danish butter biscuits, nueces surtidas (assorted shelled nuts), bombones dulces de navidad surtidos (assorted Christmas hard candy). The traditional Christmas Eve beverages are coquito (coconut eggnog), Don Q or Bacardi (rum), and Pitorro (moonshine rum).

=== Russia ===
Rozhdenstvenskiy sochelnik (Russian: Рождественский сочельник) was a common Eastern Orthodox tradition in the Russian Empire, but during the era of the Soviet Union it was greatly discouraged as a result of the official atheism of the former regime.

In modern-day Russia, the church has a service on that day, but the celebration itself has not yet regained its popularity among the people. Instead of Christmas Eve, New Year's Eve is considered to be a traditional family celebration featuring the New Year tree.

=== Serbia ===
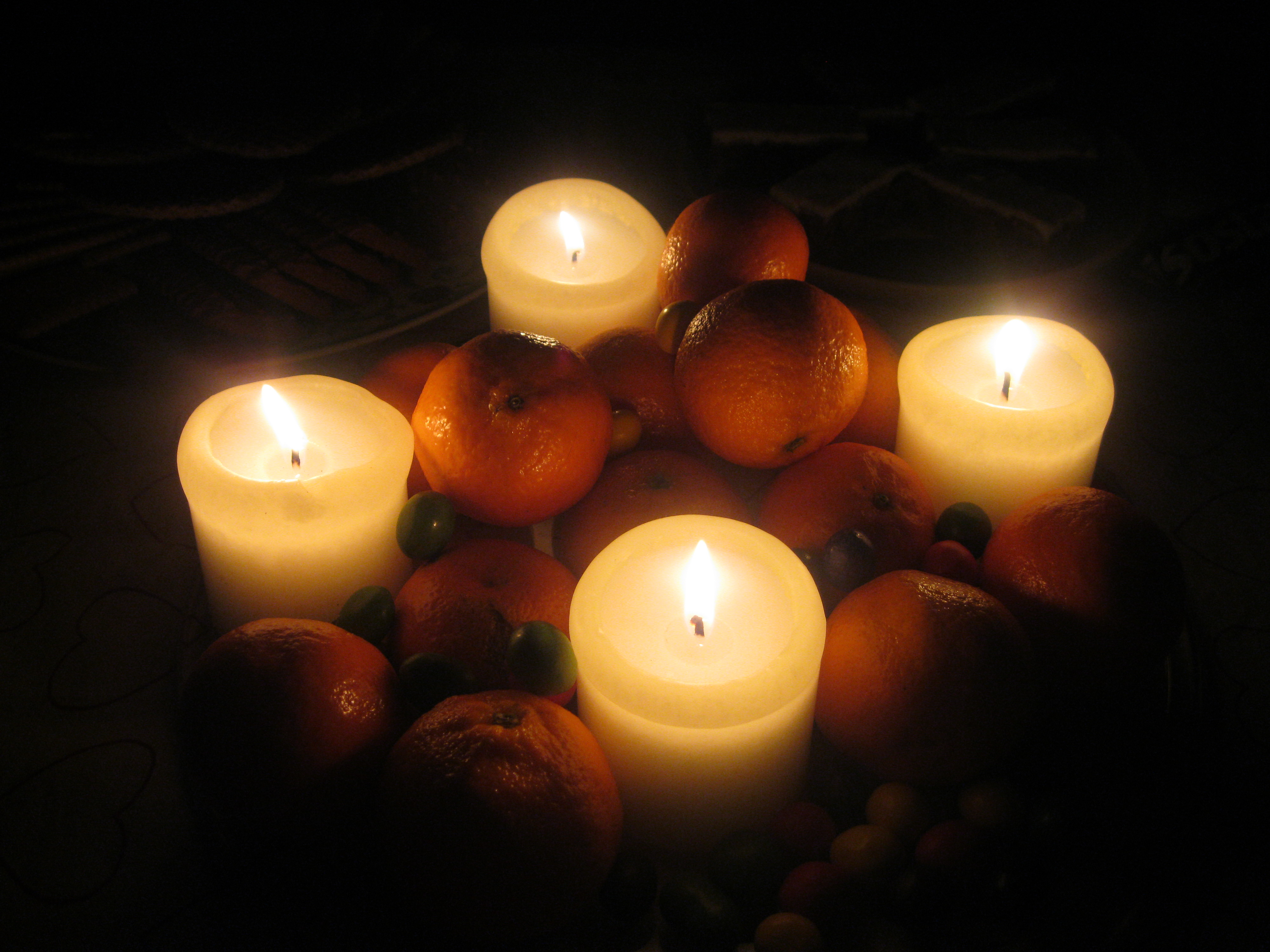
Candles on Christmas Eve 2010

In accordance with the Christmas traditions of the Serbs, their festive meal has a copious and diverse selection of foods, although it is prepared according to the rules of fasting.

As well as a round, unleavened loaf of bread and salt, which are necessary, this meal may comprise roast fish, cooked beans, sauerkraut, noodles with ground walnuts, honey, and wine.

Families in some Slavic countries leave an empty place at the table for guests (alluding to Mary and Joseph looking for shelter in Bethlehem).

=== Ukraine ===
In Ukraine, Sviatyi Vechir (Ukrainian: Святий Вечір, Holy Evening) is traditionally celebrated with a meatless twelve-dish Christmas Eve supper, or the Holy Supper (Ukrainian: Свята Вечеря, Sviata Vecheria). The main attributes of the Holy Supper in Ukraine are kutia, a poppy seed, honey and wheat dish, and uzvar, a drink made from reconstituted dried fruits. Other typical dishes are borscht, varenyky, and dishes made of fish, phaseolus and cabbage.

The twelve dishes symbolize the Twelve Apostles. Just as in Poland, it is obligatory to try a portion of all of the dishes. The table is spread with a white cloth symbolic of the swaddling clothes the Child Jesus was wrapped in, and a large white candle stands in the center of the table symbolizing Christ the Light of the World. Next to it is a round loaf of bread symbolizing Christ Bread of Life. Hay is often displayed either on the table or as a decoration in the room, reminiscent of the manger in Bethlehem.

=== Venezuela ===
In Venezuela, hallacas are normally the staple dish for Nochebuena alongside either ham or pork leg known as "pernil", panettone, rum and "Ponche Crema" (a form of alcoholic eggnog). The night is usually accompanied by traditional Christmas music known as "aguinaldos"; in Venezuela, the traditional music is known as joropo.

== Gift giving ==
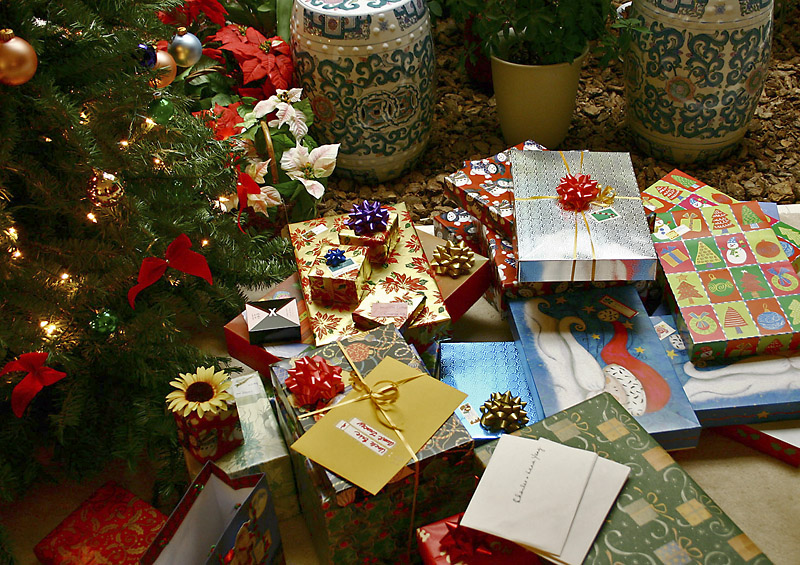
Christmas presents under the Christmas tree

In Christianity, the giving of gifts during Christmastide is traced to the Magi who brought gifts for the Christ child in the manger. During the Reformation in 16th- and 17th-century Europe, many Protestants changed the gift bringer to the Christ Child or Christkindl, and the date of giving gifts changed from 6 December to Christmas Eve. It is the night when Santa Claus makes his rounds delivering gifts to good children.

In Austria, Croatia, the Czech Republic, Hungary, and Slovakia, where Saint Nicholas (sv. Mikuláš/szent Mikulás) gives gifts on 6 December, the Christmas gift-giver is the Child Jesus (Ježíšek in Czech, Jézuska in Hungarian, Ježiško in Slovak and Isusek in Croatian).

In Austria, the Czech Republic, Denmark, Finland, Germany, Hungary, Norway, Poland, Slovakia, Sweden and Switzerland, presents are traditionally exchanged on the evening of 24 December. Children are commonly told that presents were brought either by the Christkind (German for Christ child), or by the Weihnachtsmann. Both leave the gifts, but are in most families not seen doing so. In Germany, the gifts are also brought on 6 December by "the Nikolaus" with his helper Knecht Ruprecht.

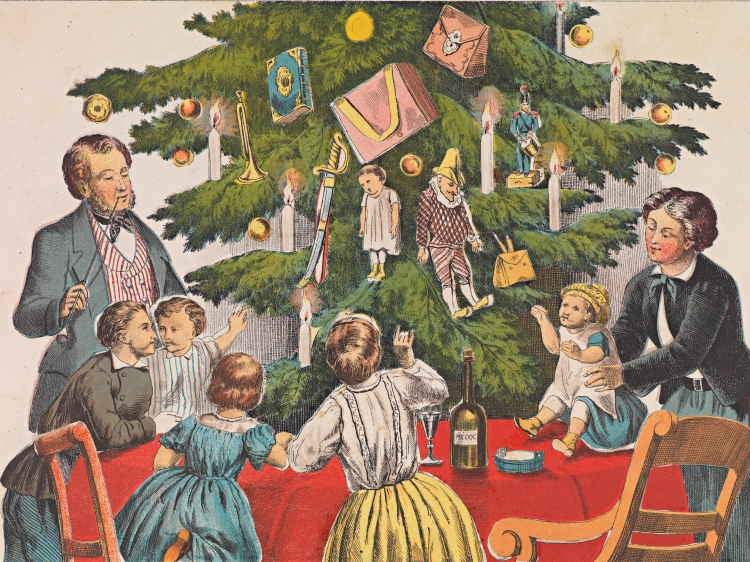
Christmas tree with presents hanging on the tree

In Estonia Jõuluvana, Finland Joulupukki, Denmark Julemanden, Norway Julenissen and Sweden Jultomten, personally meets children and gives presents on the evening of Christmas Eve.

In Argentina, Austria, Brazil, Colombia, Croatia, the Czech Republic, Denmark, Estonia, the Faroe Islands, Finland, France, Germany, Hungary, Iceland, Latvia, Lithuania, Luxembourg, Norway, Poland, Portugal, Quebec (French Canada), Romania, Uruguay, Slovakia, Slovenia, Sweden, and Switzerland, Christmas presents are opened mostly on the evening of the 24th—following German tradition, this is also the practice among the British royal family since it was introduced by Queen Victoria and Albert, Prince Consort—while in Italy, the United States, the United Kingdom, Republic of Ireland, Malta, English Canada, South Africa, New Zealand and Australia, this occurs mostly on the morning of Christmas Day.

Some countries do their gift-giving on a different date, connected to the tradition either Epiphany (in Spain, the morning of 6 January) or Sinterklaas (Belgium and the Netherlands, on the evening of 5 December).

== Other traditions ==
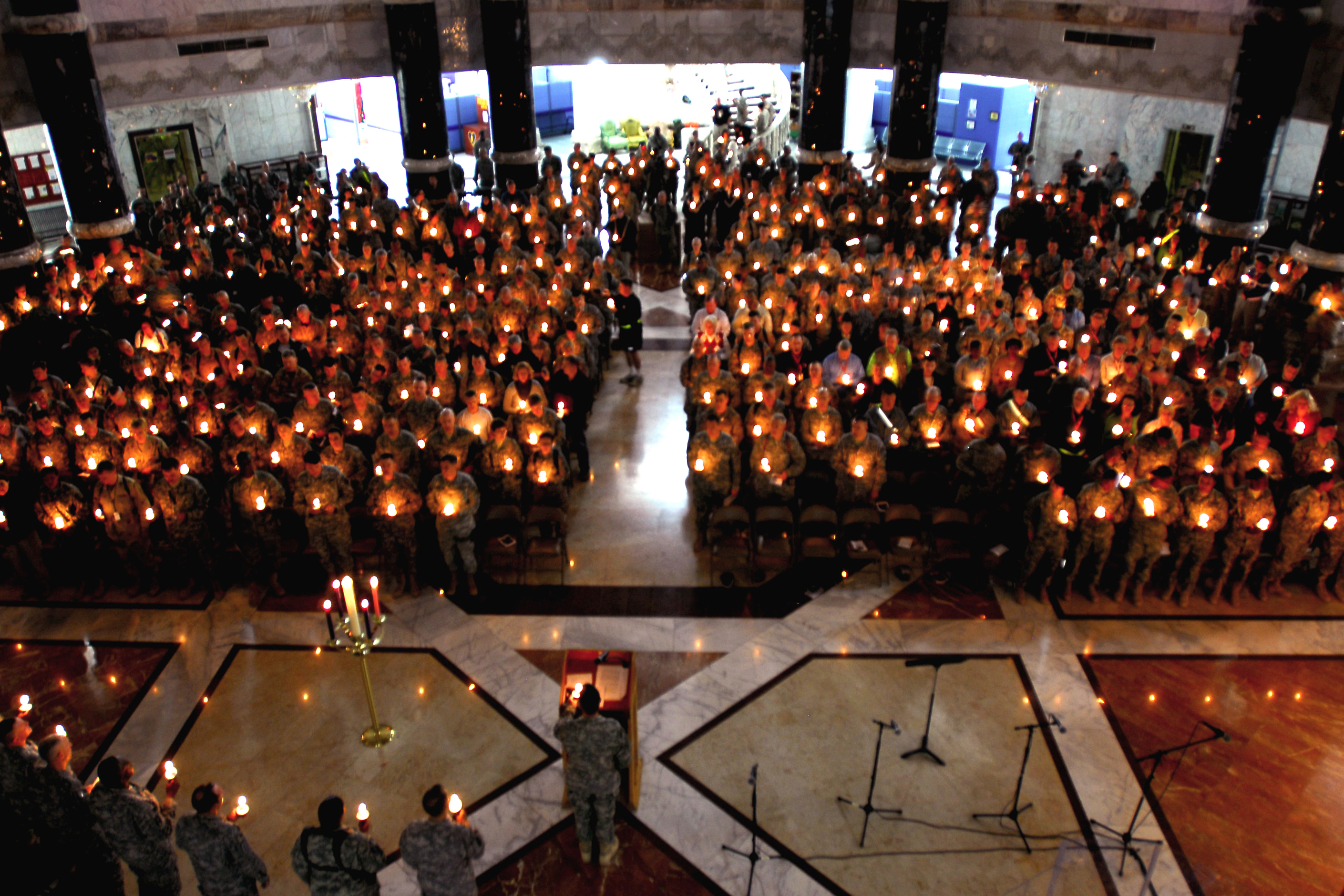
A Christmas Eve candlelight service in Baghdad, Iraq

Christmas Eve is celebrated in different ways around the world, varying by country and region. Elements common to many areas of the world include the attendance of special religious observances such as a midnight Mass or Vespers and the giving and receiving of presents. Along with Easter, Christmastime is one of the most important periods on the Christian calendar, and is often closely connected to other holidays at this time of year, such as Advent, the Feast of the Immaculate Conception, St. Nicholas Day, St. Stephen's Day, New Year's, and the Feast of the Epiphany.

Among Christians, as well as non-Christians who celebrate Christmas, the significant amount of vacation travel, and travel back to family homes, that takes place in the lead-up to Christmas means that Christmas Eve is also frequently a time of social events and parties, worldwide.

=== In Jewish culture ===
Nittel Nacht is a name given to Christmas Eve by Jewish scholars in the 17th century.

==== In contemporary American-Jewish culture ====
With Christmas Day being a work holiday and Christmas Eve often being a partial work holiday throughout the United States, there is a space of unfilled free time during which much of American commerce and society is not functioning, and which can give rise to a sense of loneliness or alienation for American Jews.

Jews also typically do not engage in the family gathering and religious worship activities that are central to Christmas Eve for Christians.

Typical contemporary activities have usually been limited to "Chinese and a movie"—consuming a meal at a Chinese restaurant, which tend to be open for business on the Christmas holiday, and watching a movie at the theater or at home, stereotypically a rerun of the 1946 film It's a Wonderful Life.

Since the 1980s a variety of social events for young Jews have sprung up, and become popular, on Christmas Eve. These include the Matzo Ball, The Ball, and a number of local events organized by Jewish communities and local Jewish Federations in North America.

=== In Chinese culture ===
In Mandarin, Christmas Eve is called Píng'ān yè (平安夜, "peaceful night", etymologically from the Chinese title of the Christmas carol Silent Night). People exchange apples, because the word for "apple" (苹(píng)果) is a rhyming wordplay with "peace" (平(píng)安).

=== In Inuit culture ===
In Inuit territories, Christmas Eve is called Quviasukvik. The Inuit celebrate it as their new year.

=== United States ===
In New Mexico and areas of San Diego, California, Christmas Eve (nochebuena) is celebrated by lighting luminarias and farolitos.

== Historical events ==
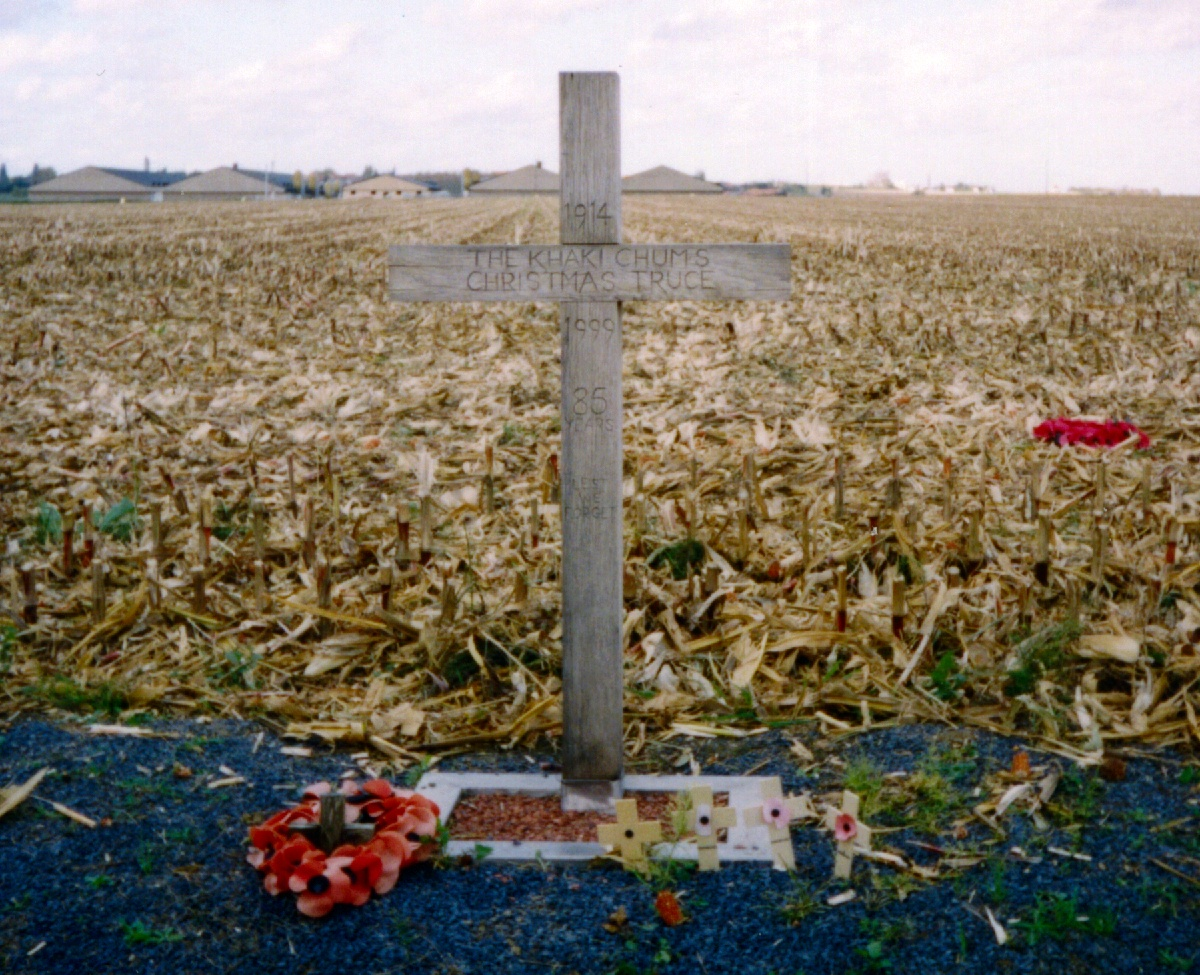
A cross, left near Ypres in Belgium in 1999, to commemorate the site of the 1914 Christmas Truce. The text reads 1914—The Khaki Chum's Christmas Truce—85 Years—Lest We Forget.

The 1968 Apollo 8 Christmas Eve broadcast and reading from the Book of Genesis

A number of historical events have been influenced by the occurrence of Christmas Eve.

=== Christmas truce ===
During World War I in 1914 and 1915 there was an unofficial Christmas truce, particularly between British and German troops. The truce began on Christmas Eve, 24 December 1914, when German troops began decorating the area around their trenches in the region of Ypres, Belgium, for Christmas. They began by placing candles on trees, then continued the celebration by singing Christmas carols, most notably Stille Nacht ("Silent Night"). The British troops in the trenches across from them responded by singing English carols. The two sides shouted Christmas greetings to each other. Soon there were calls for visits across the "No man's land" when small gifts were exchanged. The truce also allowed a breathing space during which recently killed soldiers could be brought back behind their lines by burial parties. Funerals took place as soldiers from both sides mourned the dead together and paid their respects. At one funeral in No Man's Land, soldiers from both sides gathered and read a passage from Psalm 23. The truce occurred in spite of opposition at higher levels of the military command. Earlier in the autumn, a call by Pope Benedict XV for an official truce between the warring governments had been ignored.

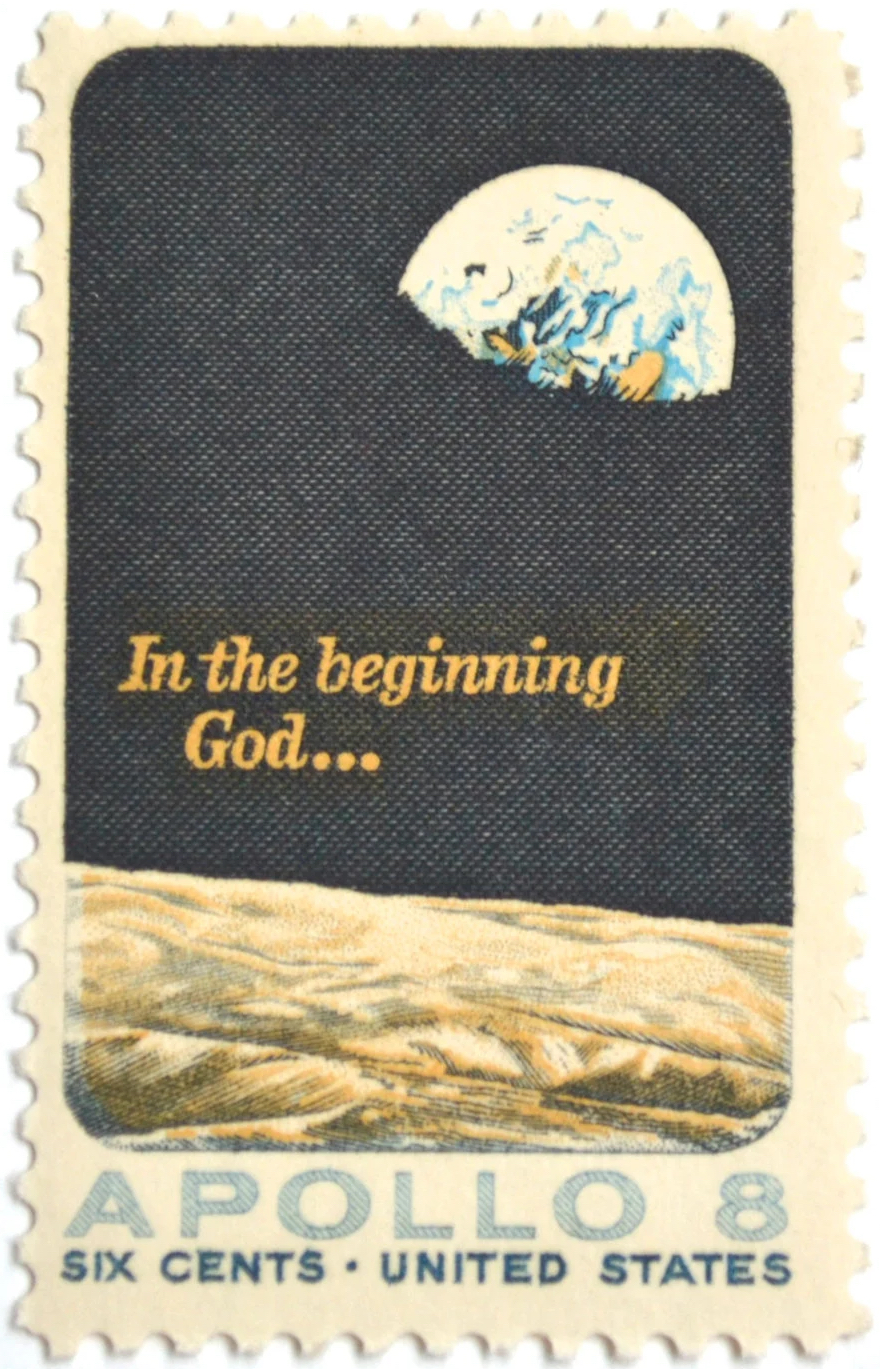
Apollo 8 commemorative stamp of the Christmas Eve Genesis reading, issued in 1969, includes the Earthrise photograph by NASA astronaut William Anders

=== Apollo 8 reading from Genesis ===
On 24 December 1968, in what was the most watched television broadcast to that date, the Apollo 8 astronauts Bill Anders, Jim Lovell and Frank Borman surprised the world with a reading of the Creation from the Book of Genesis as they orbited the Moon.

In 1969, the United States Postal Service issued a stamp (Scott# 1371) commemorating the Apollo 8 flight around the Moon. The stamp featured a detail of Anders' famous photograph Earthrise of the Earth "rising" over the Moon (NASA image AS8-14-2383HR), taken on Christmas Eve, and the words, "In the beginning God...".

== See also ==
- Christmas Day
- Nativity of Jesus
- Santa Claus
- Winter holiday season
- Réveillon
