= Kūčiukai =

Traditional Lithuanian dish

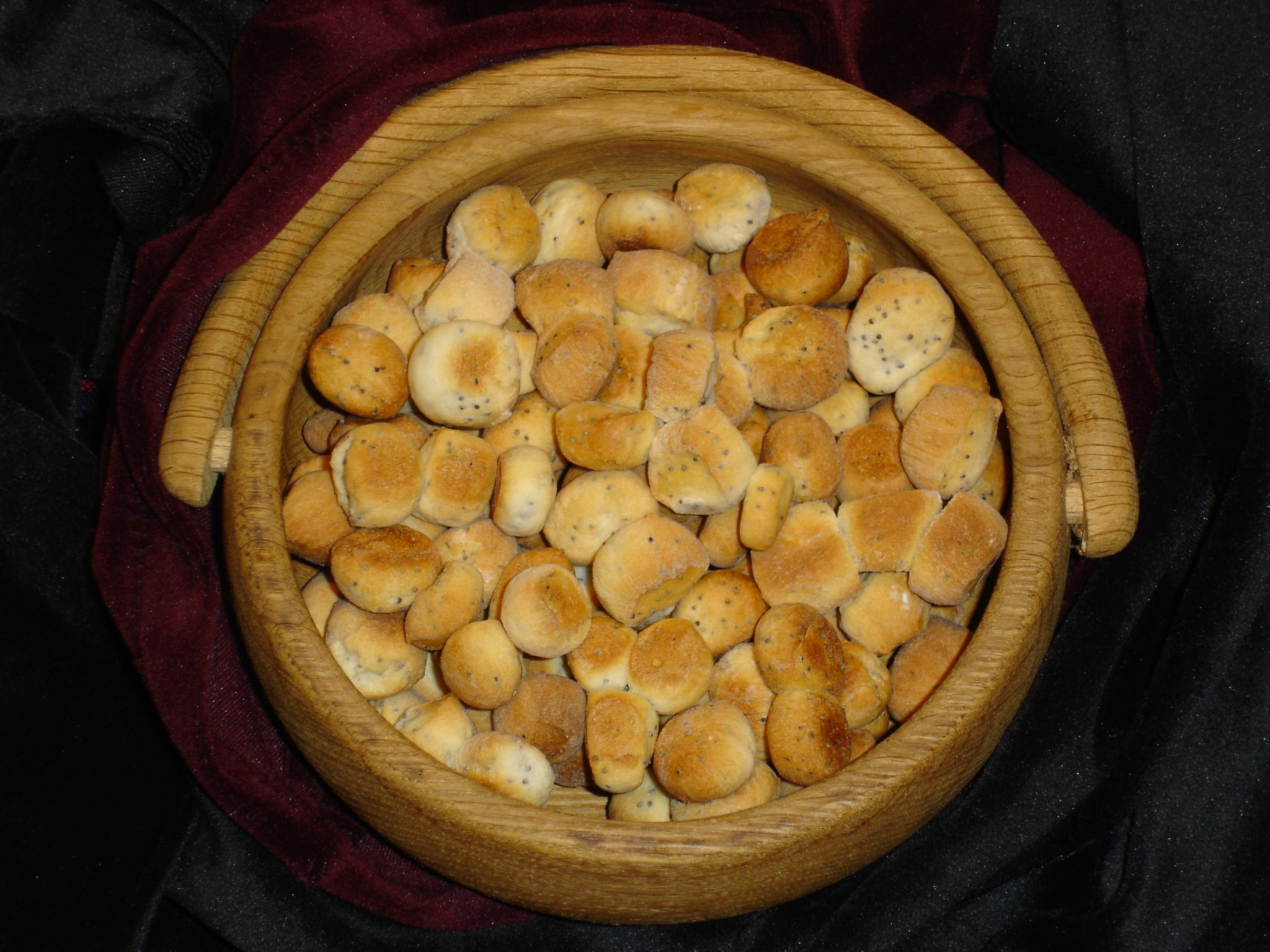
- Kūčiukai, not yet soaked in the poppy seed milk
- Alternative names: šližikai, prėskutė
- Type: Baked goods
- Place of origin: Lithuania
- Main ingredients: Dough, leavening agent, poppy seeds

Kūčiukai (šližikai, prėskutė), also called Christmas cakes, are a traditional Lithuanian dish served on Kūčios, the traditional Lithuanian Christmas Eve. They are small, slightly sweet, baked goods made from leavened dough and poppy seeds. They vary in sweetness and are usually eaten dry but can be served soaked in poppy milk or with cranberry kissel.

== History ==
The ancient dish Kūčia was made from wheat, beans, peas, barley, and poppies, and seasoned with honey. In Aukštaitija, for some time, Kūčia was called porridge of coarse barley groats, eaten with poppies and tossed with honey-sweetened water. In Panevėžys region at the beginning of the 20th century, Kūčia was made from a mixture of wheat and peas flavored with water sweetened with poppies and honey. A common feature of the variants was that the dish was made from whole or slightly crushed cereals or groats and flavored with honey, poppy seeds or hemp. After the First World War, small poppy seed buns were baked in Lithuania, called Kūčiukai. In Dzūkija, a flatbread was baked, which the family later broke and soaked in poppy milk. In Suvalkija, the buns were larger than they are now and elongated.

Small round wheat flour with yeast acquired the common name for Kūčiukai (Christmas cakes).

Kūčiukai can be used for games, guesses, spells, and gifts on Christmas Eve. According to customs, housewives should bake Kūčiukai on Christmas Eve day.

In some places, Kūčiukai were baked from barley or buckwheat flour as well as wheat.

== See also ==
- Poppy milk
