= Poppy milk =

Traditional Lithuanian cuisine

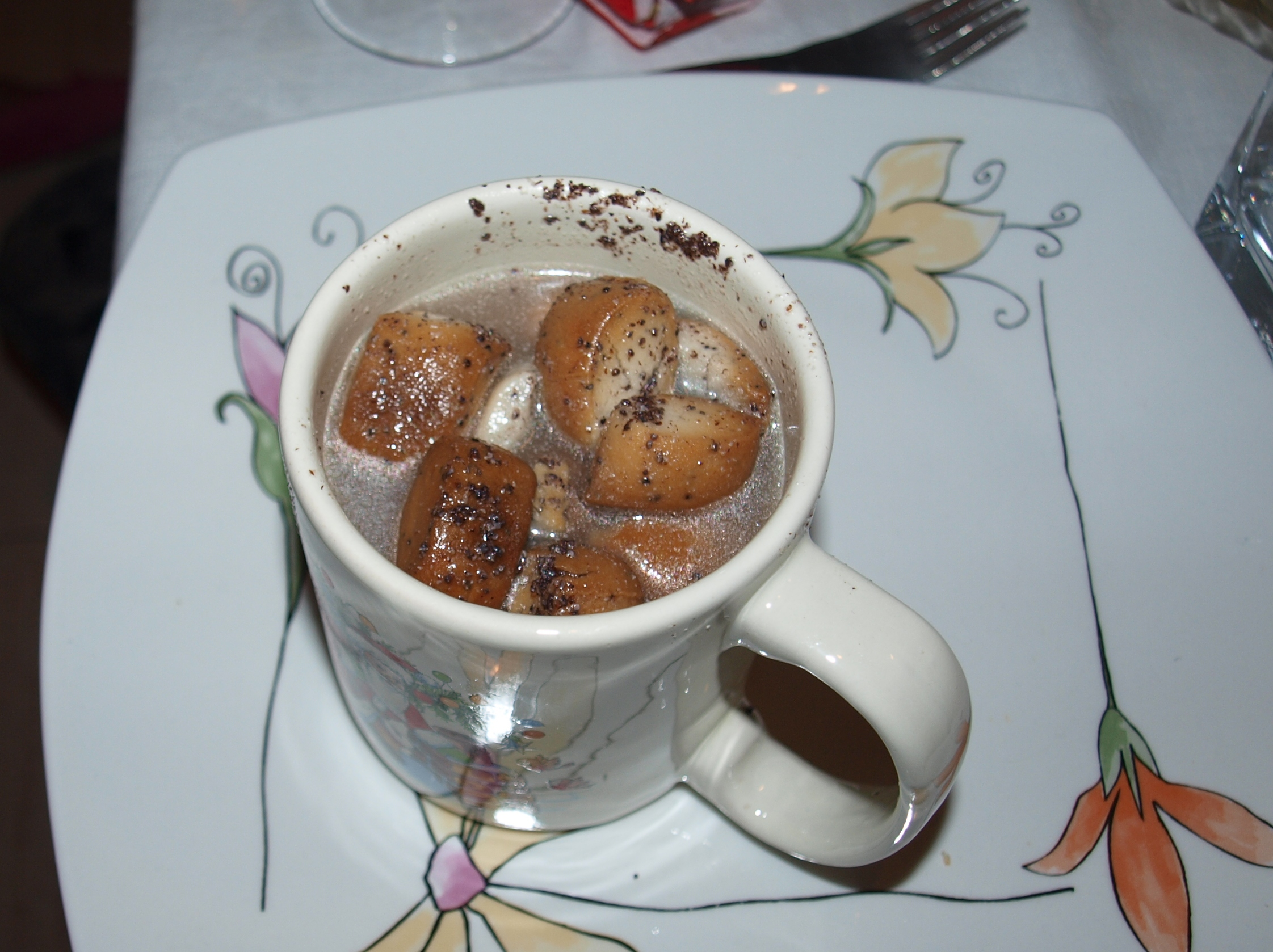
- Poppy milk with poppy pastries
- Origin: Lithuania
- Flavour: Sweet
- Ingredients: Poppy seeds, water

Poppy milk (aguonų pienas; aguonpienis) is a traditional Lithuanian drink or soup, one of the 12-dish Christmas Eve supper Kūčios. Usually it is eaten together with kūčiukai, another traditional Lithuanian Christmas Eve dish. It is also an ingredient in Kutia, a meal served during a traditional Ukrainian Christmas Eve feast. This drink is considered a dessert.

== Preparation ==
To make poppy milk, one or two glasses of poppy seeds are needed. The poppy seeds are soaked in hot water for a day or so, changing the water over time, until the seeds become soft. They are then crushed in a food processor (or traditionally with a pestle in a mortar), until a white liquid comes out. Cold water is added (preferably water that has been boiled, and cooled), and the poppy seeds are strained and crushed once more. This process is repeated several times in order to get a good poppy milk concentrate. The poppy milk concentrate is then diluted with cold boiled water (the quantity of the water used, is a matter of taste, and certain family preferences, but the flavor of the poppy seeds should be pronounced). Finally, sugar or honey is added to sweeten the poppy seed milk.

== Additional usage ==
Although traditionally served during the Christmas holiday, in modern times poppy milk has additional uses. It has been suggested as a sleep aid. There is limited information on poppy milk's effects, but studies on poppy seeds have shown promise.

Poppy milk has also been used as a milk substitute. Using poppy seed milk as a milk substitute is not a new application, but it is not frequently included in studies of milk alternatives.

== See also ==
- Kūčiukai
