= Kūčios =

Traditional Lithuanian Christmas Eve meal

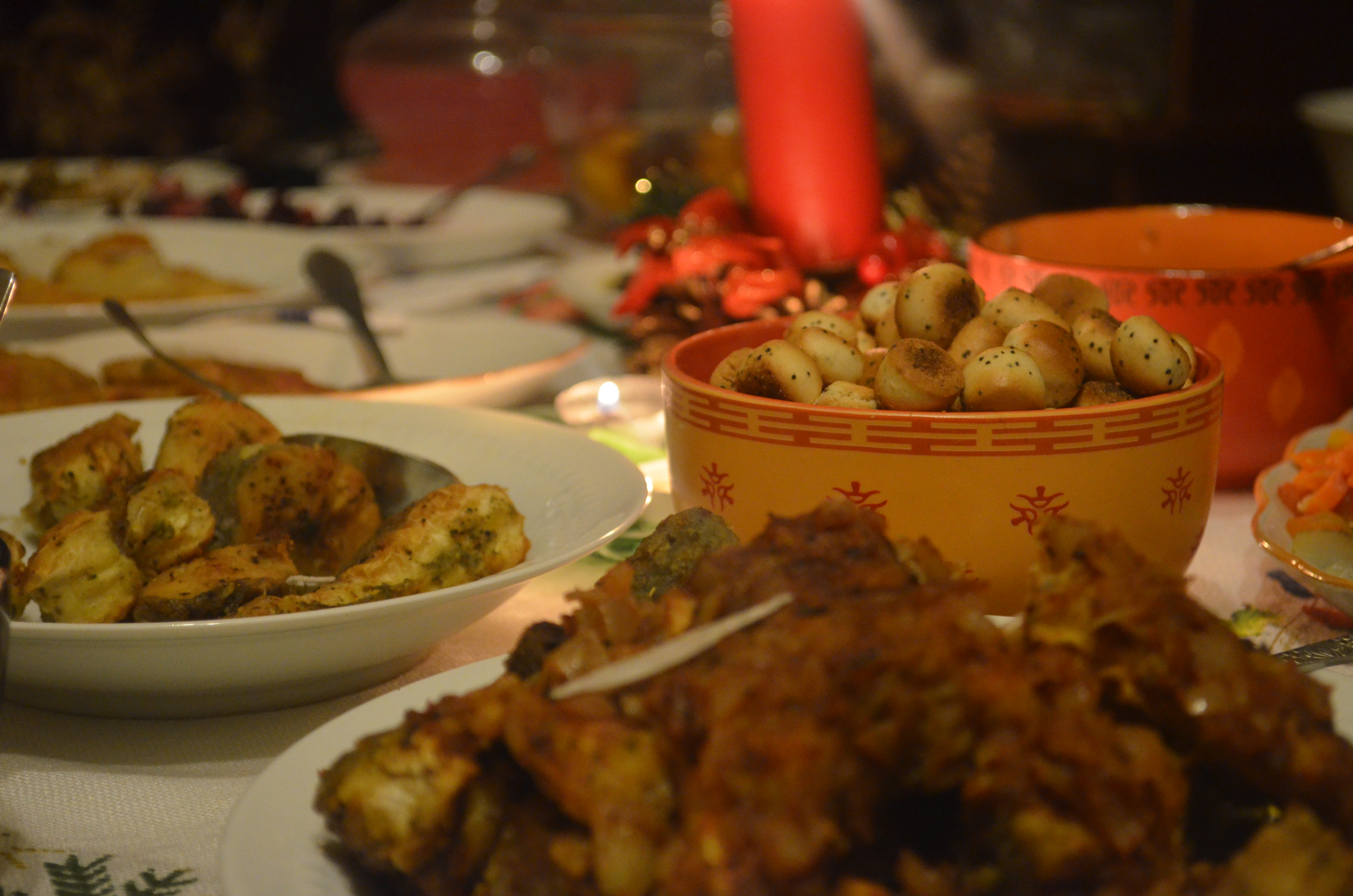
Lithuanian Christmas Eve table with kūčiukai

Kūčios (Lithuanian pronunciation: [ˈkuːtɕɔs]) or Kūtės (Samogitian Dialect) is the traditional Christmas Eve dinner in Lithuania, held on December 24. The meal is a family occasion which includes many traditions of both pagan and Christian origin. Some traditions are no longer widespread and usually Lithuanians just enjoy dinner with relatives and friends while the main events and festivities are left for Christmas Day.

== Importance ==
Everyone in a family makes a special effort to come home for the Christmas Eve supper, even from great distances. They make the journey not so much for the meal as for the sacred ritual of Kūčios. Kūčios draws the family members closer, bringing everyone together and strengthening the family ties. In this spirit, if a family member has died that year or cannot attend the meal (only for very serious reasons) an empty place is left at the table. A plate is still placed on the table and a chair is drawn up, but no spoons, knives or forks are set. A small candle is placed on the plate and lit during the meal. It is believed that the spirit of the deceased family member participates in the Kūčios along with everyone.

== Preparation ==
Preparing for Kūčios is an all day event, though the preparations can begin up to a week in advance in some communities. On Christmas Eve, the entire residence must be thoroughly cleaned and all of the bed linens must be changed. Everyone attending Kūčios must bathe and dress in clean clothes before the evening meal. Before gathering at the ritual table, everybody makes up with their neighbors and forgives their enemies. The twelve dishes for the evening meal are prepared as is the meal for the first day of Christmas during the day.

Traditionally, people fast and abstain from meat and dairy foods for the entire day. While the Catholic Church has decreed that food may be eaten as often as desired on Christmas Eve, most Lithuanians still adhere to the original custom of abstinence. Before they changed their stance, Catholics could only eat a handful of boiled peas and water on Christmas Eve with exceptions allowing small children, the sick or very old persons to eat a bit more. This tradition is still followed by many Lithuanians. Although official fasting no longer exists, most Lithuanians refrain from eating meat on Christmas Eve so as to preserve tradition. Regardless of what is consumed during the day, it is vitally important that the Christmas Eve dinner include no meat dishes because it would then no longer be called Kūčios but an ordinary meal prepared for any other evening.

For the Christmas Eve dinner, the table is prepared in a special way. A handful of fine hay is spread evenly on the table which is a reminder that Jesus was born in a stable and laid in a manger on hay. The table is then covered with a pure white tablecloth, set with plates and decorated with symbols of the life force, which sustains the human world according to pagan beliefs. These include fir boughs, candles, and a bundle of unthreshed rye, which pagan families would traditionally bind around their apple trees the next day. Live flowers are not appropriate for the table, in particular the red or white poinsettias that are so common in other countries during the Christmas season.

== Dinner ==
Traditionally, dinner starts when the first star appears in the sky, though this is no longer common practice. Waiting for the star to appear in the sky symbolizes the Star of Bethlehem leading the Magi to Bethlehem. Instead of a town, the star leads the members of the family to the table for dinner. If it is a cloudy night, the evening meal begins when the head of the house announces it is time to eat. Either way it is determined, the meal usually begins between six and seven o'clock.

=== Apples ===
In certain Lithuanian regions apples were placed on the table because December 24 is the feast day of Adam and Eve. The apples recalled our first parents through whose sin mankind fell and that the world was saved through the submissiveness of the New Eve— Mary, the Mother of God—to God's will.

If apples are placed on the table, the mother takes an apple, cuts it into as many pieces as there are diners and gives the father the first piece. This symbolizes the fall of the first parents when Eve gave Adam the apple which he took and ate. Then the remaining apple pieces are distributed to those at the table.

=== Number of dishes ===
The current tradition of there being twelve separate dishes is of Christian origin. Historically, the number of dishes, and the reason for the number, varied according to pagan and Christian traditions. The pagans practiced Kūčios traditionally with nine different foods, because there were nine months in the year according to the ancient calendar. According to the alternative tradition, the thirteen different dishes represented the thirteen lunar months of the year. However, under the influence of the Christian religion and the solar calendar, the number changed to twelve. For Christians, the twelve different dishes served on the table represent Jesus' twelve apostles.

=== Food ===
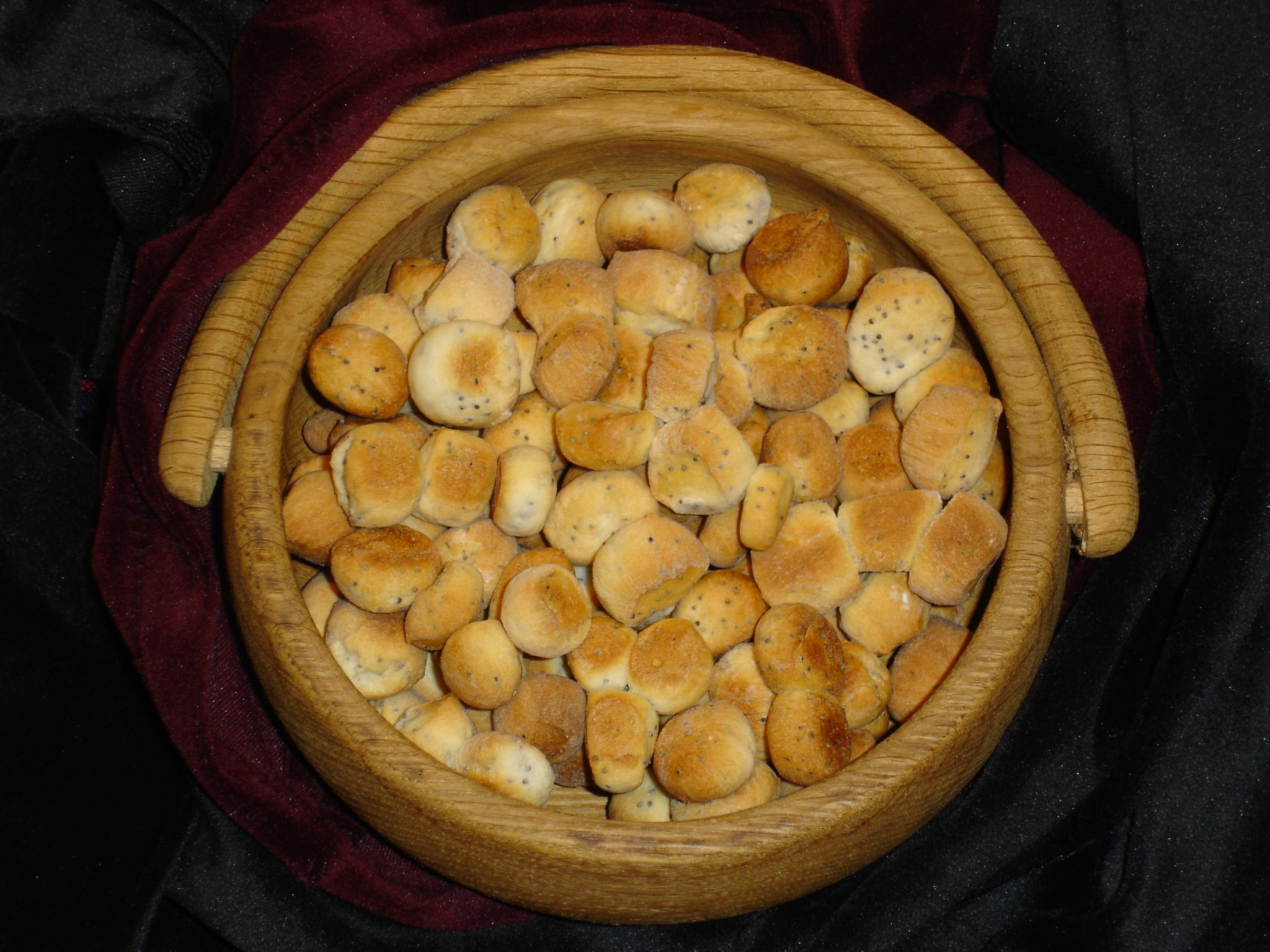
Kūčiukai not yet soaked in the poppy seed milk

The evening meal consists of very specific dishes. There can be no meat, dairy, or hot food. Typical dishes include fish, vegetables, and bread. Silkė is a name for herring, a type of fish, dish which is served with different sauces. The sauces can be tomato, mushroom, or onion based. Ungurys, or smoked European eel, is also a common dish. Other common dishes include boiled or baked potatoes, spanguolių kisielius (cranberry kissel), cooked sauerkraut (prepared without meat), mushrooms, kūčiukai or šližikai (bite-sized hard biscuits) with agounų pienas or aguonpienis (a poppy seed "milk"), cranberry pudding, and multigrain breads with honey and margarine because butter is not allowed being a dairy product.

According to ethnologists, Kūčiukai is the archaic form of ritual bread, that is meant for the souls. They are so tiny because souls have no material bodies; the plentifulness of them is due to the fact that there exists a great number of souls.

Everything served at the meal should be made from ingredients available in Lithuania during the winter. This is because the people whose lifestyle produced the Kūčios traditions made do with food prepared in the summer and fall: dried, pickled and otherwise preserved for the winter. The meal is traditionally served with water, homemade cider, or fruit juice.

=== Rituals ===
In the past rituals used to be widespread and now are not as common, the rituals used to predict the future and welfare of family members such as these:

- A stem of hay is pulled from under the tablecloth. It cannot be picked; the first one the fingers encounter must be drawn. The person with the longest of the drawn straws will live the longest life, while the person with the fattest straw will have the most fulfilling life. A bent straw indicates the holder will have a turn in their life, while a straw with fork in it indicates many decisions to come in the following year. If a long, slender stalk is withdrawn, the girl can expect a tall slender husband, while a short, fat, bent stalk means a short, fat crooked husband. If this happens to a man, his future wife will be slender and tall or fat and short like the straw drawn. Married persons can also guess next year's happiness from the kind of stalk pulled. A thin stem indicates a flat, empty wallet, while a fat one means a prosperous year, a full wallet. If a married woman pulls a straw thicker in the middle, she will have a baby that year.
- While seated at the table, look at the walls where the candlelight casts the shadows of those dining. If your shadow is large, wide and of the whole person, the year will be good, there will be no illness, everything will go well. If the shadow lacks a head a terrible calamity will occur; if it is skinny, unclear and wavering, the year will be difficult.

=== Afterwards ===
After the meal, everyone leaves the table to go to sleep or the midnight mass, known as the Shepherds' Mass. The food is left to stand overnight. It is believed that the spirits of deceased relatives or loved ones will visit the home during the night and the table set with food would make them feel welcome. It was believed that the baby Jesus allows the souls of all the departed to return to earth to visit their families.

== Traditions ==
The evening of Kūčios is filled with many traditions for either predicting the future or assuring success in the year to come. These traditions predate the Christians coming to Lithuania and, as such, are all pagan beliefs.

=== Weddings ===
On Kūčios, as during many other Lithuanian feasts, much attention is paid to wedding themes. Many of these rituals involve the maidens in the house. There are several rare marriage charms:

- The windows are covered after the meal is completed, a rooster and hen are pulled out from under the stove, and their tails are tied together. If the rooster pulls the hen to the door, there will be a wedding and if he pulls the hen back under the stove, there will be no wedding.
- Three items are placed on the doorsill: a ring, a piece of chalk and a piece of bread. A hen is brought out. If the hen picks up the ring, the girl will marry. If the hen picks up the piece of chalk, the girl will die. The girl will live poorly if the hen picks up the bread.
- A pot of water is brought to a boil and then two pieces of coal are dropped into the water. If the coals come together, there will be a wedding.
- Every girl in the room lights a candle. All the candles are placed on the table's edge and blown out by the master of the house. The girl whose candle is not blown out will remain unmarried.
- A ring is dropped into a half filled glass of water by a maiden. The number of ripples shows the number of years before her wedding.
- At midnight, girls place two sacred candles and between them a glass filled with water, birch ashes and drop a wedding band inside. Looking through the glass, they will either see their chosen male or a coffin.
- Three whole herring, without breading should be eaten by a maiden before going to bed. A towel should be placed on two wooden rods, set over a bowl filled with water by their bed. They will dream of their future male while sleeping.
- Quietly tie up even knots, putting into each one money, a piece of coal, a lump of earth, a piece of clay from the stove, grain or seeds, and a small rag. All these knotted pieces are placed in a tub, next to the girl's bed, so that they can be touched without leaving the bed. The meanings of the different knots are: the ring represents a wedding, money represents riches, coal represents fire, earth represents death, rag represents children, seeds or grains represent a good harvest.
- That night, two needles are dropped into a plate filled with water. If the needles come together, there will be a wedding.

=== Animals ===
On Christmas Eve a greater attention was given to animals. This was to assure their health, fertility and breeding success:

- Hay from the supper table was later fed to the animals.
- If one sewed on Christmas Eve, sheep will bear motley lambs.
- To assure that animals do not scatter in the summer, the entire family must eat the Kūčios supper together.
- To keep the animal herds together in summer, tie up the cutlery after supper with the whip, broom and shepherd.
- No need to lock barn doors on this night, place a cross or another sign on the doors so that harmful spirits are ineffective.
- Those who sprinkle a mixture of wheat and peas in the barn, will have good animals the following year.
- After supper the mistress of the house should take all milk pots outside and place all around the farmstead so that next year the cows will give much milk.
- After supper the mistress of the house takes the butter churn and walks around the fields churning it, so that there will be an abundance of butter.
- No spinning should be done on this day because it will cause calf abortions and animals to slobber.
- After milking the cow, milk should be poured three times over the cow so that the witches do not drain the cow on the feast day of Saint John.
- On this day stroke the cows, so that they will be fat and have no pustules.
- Several Christmas wafers are saved and fed to cows, to keep the milk from spoiling.
- To make your horses look good, steal manure from your neighbor and feed it to your horses.
- So that no one can bewitch the horses, the master of the house feeds them ears of rye.
- Sheep should be sheared on this day so that new born lambs have curly fleece.
- To keep wolves from carrying away animals, mention wolves while eating.
- Carry a sieve, a strainer for separating lumps from powdered material, around the fields to prevent the killing of colts by wolves.
- Wash windows, door handles, and all the corners of the house. Give the wash water to the animals to drink; it will keep evil eyes away from the animals.

== See also ==
- List of dining events

== Bibliography ==
- Dundzila, Audrius (1990), "The Winter Solstice: Kucios and Kaledos", Romuva/USA (2)
- Vansevičienė, Danutė (17 December 2001), Christmas, archived from the original on 2007-01-29
- Vansevičienė, Danutė (17 December 2001), Christmas Eve, archived from the original on 2007-02-06
- Vansevičienė, Danutė (17 December 2001c), Prognostications, archived from the original on 2007-02-08
- Lithuanian-American Community (2002-10-29), Christmas Eve - Kucios, archived from the original on 8 February 2007
- Ramuva; Vilnius (2007), "Winter Solstice - Saulegriza", Lietuvos Romuva
- Lithuanian-American Community (2006), Christmas Traditions
- Marcinkevičienė, Nijolė (2007), Lithuanian Customs And Traditions, archived from the original on 2007-02-05
- Arūnas Vaicekauskas, Ancient Lithuanian calendar festivals, 2014, Vytautas Magnus University, Versus Aureus. ISBN 978-609-467-018-3,ISBN 978-609-467-017-6
