= Pain petri =

Braided bread of Moroccan Jewish origin

Pain Petri
- Type: Bread
- Place of origin: Originally Morocco, today more common in France and Israel
- Region or state: Morocco, France, Israel, and the Moroccan Jewish diaspora
- Created by: Moroccan Jewish community
- Serving temperature: Traditionally for Shabbat, and other Jewish holidays
- Main ingredients: Eggs, fine white flour, water, yeast, sugar, anise seeds, sesame seeds, sugar and salt

Pain petri is a braided bread of Moroccan Jewish origin, that is traditionally baked for Shabbat, the Jewish sabbath, as well as Rosh Hashanah and other holidays, and is popular among the Moroccan Jewish community of Morocco, France, and Israel.

== Etymology ==
The name Pain petri in French translates literally to "kneaded bread", due to the historically long time required to knead pain petri prior to the invention of stand mixers, and other kitchen appliances. Traditionally the women of the Moroccan Jewish community would knead the dough for a long period of time for the pain petri to obtain a lighter consistency.

== Overview ==
Pain petri is made with an enriched dough, contained flour, egg, oil, sugar, salt, and anise seeds. It is braided into a shape similar to a narrower challah, or it is braided into an oblong ring shape similar to a Jerusalem bagel. It is traditionally served for Shabbat as the bread used for HaMotzi, as well as the bread served with Shabbat meals, it is also served on some other Jewish holidays and special occasions. A special round variation is traditionally made for Rosh Hashanah.

== History ==
Pain petri has been traditionally prepared by members of the Moroccan Jewish community for hundreds of years, since before the Spanish Inquisition. It is somewhat similar to other Shabbat breads such as the Algerian Jewish mouna, the Ethiopian Jewish dabo, the Yemenite Jewish kubaneh, and challah. Though it has a number of key differences from these other Jewish breads. For most of its history, pain petri was baked in communal ovens, as the members of the Moroccan Jewish community did not have their own ovens at home and had to share a communal, outdoor oven amongst the community. It has only been since the expulsion of Jews from Morocco, and their subsequent return to Israel, or emigration to France in the mid-20th century, that this bread has been baked in home ovens. With the exodus of their community from Morocco, pain petri has been brought by the Moroccan Jewish diaspora to France, Israel, the United States, and Canada, though it is still baked by the remaining Jewish community in Morocco.

== Preparation ==
Pain petri differs from challah, and indeed many other breads in general, in that it is typically made relatively quickly, with the process from start to finish taking an hour. Many recipes for the bread only require 90 minutes of preparation until the pain petri is ready. A dough is made with flour, water, eggs, yeast, oil, sugar, and anise seeds, and a hole is poked through the middle of the dough which is allowed to rest for 15 minutes. It is then shaped into logs, and then braided to form a number of small loaves in a braided oblong oval-shape, or a braided "baguette"-style shape (similar to a narrow challah). It is brushed with an egg wash, and topped with toasted sesame seeds, and baked. It can also be made in a monkey bread-style shape, similar to kubaneh. It is traditionally served with the Moroccan Jewish shabbat meal of chamin, chrain, or tagine, with couscous.

== In popular culture ==
Pain petri was featured in The Encyclopedia of Jewish Food by Rabbi Gil Marks. It was also featured in Joan Nathan’s 2004 cookbook The Jewish Holiday Cookbook, as well as her 2010 cookbook Quiches, Kugel, and Couscous: My Search For Jewish Cooking in France, where she wrote of encountering a version of the bread originating from a member the Jewish community that formerly resided Fez, Morocco.

== See also ==
- Mouna - a similar Algerian Jewish bread
- Challah - a similar European Jewish bread
- Dabo - a similar Ethiopian Jewish bread
- Kubaneh - a similar Yemenite Jewish sabbath bread
