= Zopf =

Braid-shaped bread

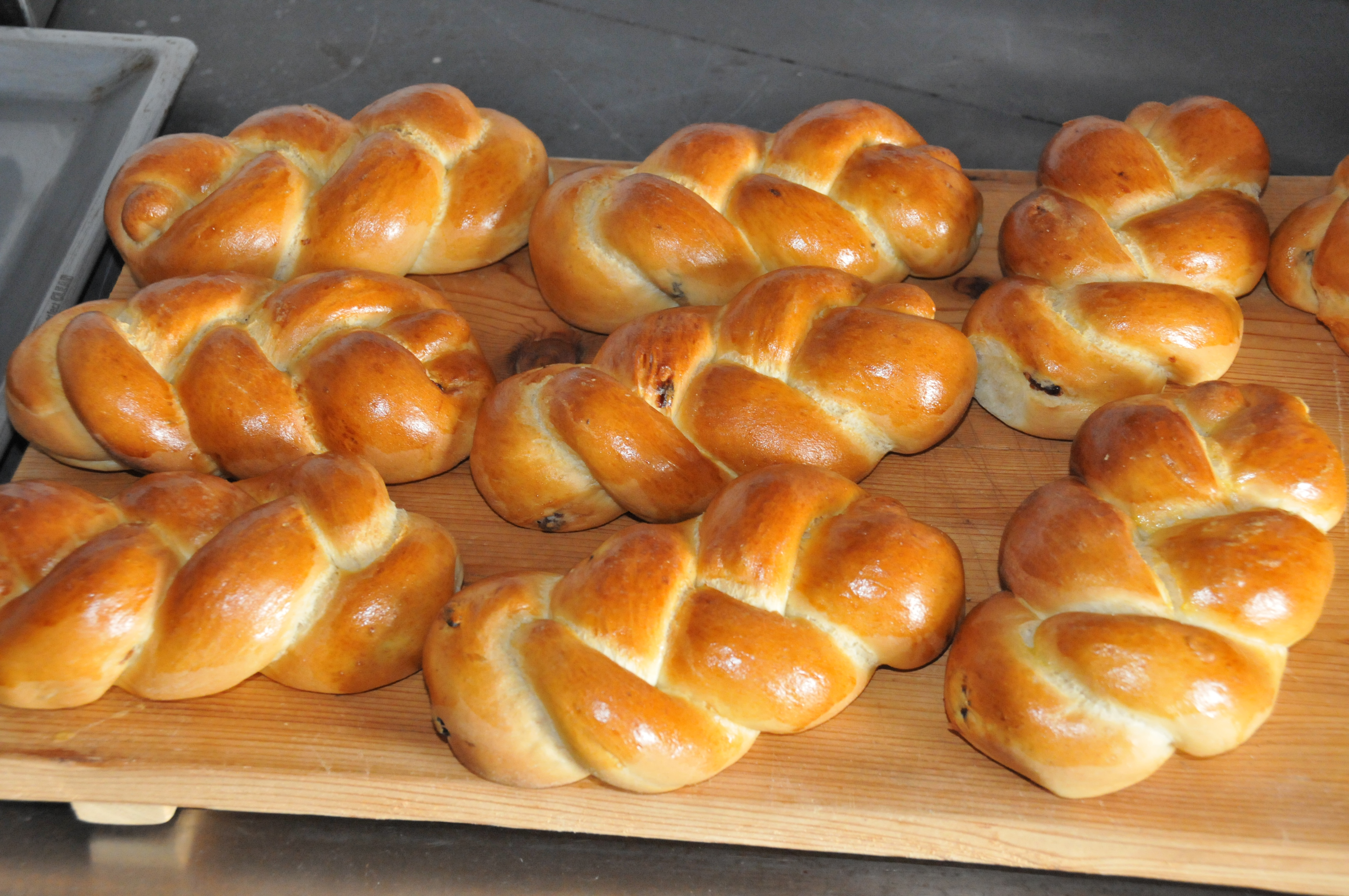
- Alternative names: Züpfe
- Course: breakfast
- Place of origin: Switzerland, Austria, Germany
- Main ingredients: Flour, milk, eggs, butter, yeast
- Variations: Hefekranz or Hefezopf

Zopf (German pronunciation: [tsɔpf]), Butterzopf ([ˈbʊtɐˌtsɔpf]) or Züpfe ([ˈtsʏpfə]) (tresse [tʁɛs] in French and treccia [ˈtrettʃa] in Italian) is a type of Swiss, Austrian, and German bread made from white flour, milk, eggs, butter and yeast. The zopf is typically brushed with egg yolk, egg wash, or milk before baking, lending it its golden crust. It is baked in the form of a plait and traditionally eaten on Sunday mornings. The name in all three languages is derived from the shape of the bread, meaning "braid" or "pigtail".

Unlike other braid-shaped breads such as challah or Hefekranz, Swiss Zopf is unsweetened.

== See also ==
- Cardamom bread
- Panaret
- Pulla
- Vánočka
