= Nafka minnah =

Talmudic phrase

Nafka minnah (Aramaic: נפקא מינה, lit. "emerges from it" ) is a Talmudic phrase used in analytical debates. It is often used in the phrase Mai nafka minnah? (מאי נפקא מינה), which asks, "What is the practical difference?"

== Terminology ==
The question mai nafka minnah is a way of testing the difference between two or more explanations for a given law, by investigating the different practical halachic rulings that would follow from each explanation. In other words, it means "so how do they differ in practice?"

It is contrasted with the question be-mai peligei, which also means "how do they differ", but implies that the two views have the same practical consequences and that the difference is the intellectual process by which they are arrived at (for example, which Biblical verse is the relevant authority).

== Example ==
Examples of a nafka minnah abound, both in Jewish law as derived from the Talmud, as well as in any situation that presents multiple rationales for a particular item.

To begin the Shabbos meals, kiddush is recited, followed by the eating of challah. During kiddush, the challah should be covered, which has led to a market for commercially available challah covers that are often beautifully decorated with embroidery or other designs. There are three reasons given for this practice:

1. As a commemoration of the manna, which was covered by dew.
2. As a mechanism to allow for the wine to be consumed prior to the bread. In Jewish law, blessings are recited prior to the consumption of food or drink, and when faced with multiple food and drink items, there are laws stipulating which items should precede which others. Bread, as a staple food item, precedes all other foods and, in fact, the blessing recited over bread covers other food items (with some exceptions). If the bread was allowed to remain uncovered during the kiddush, its preferential status would be belittled (known as kadima, literally "precedence" or "priority") when the wine is consumed first.
3. As a display of honor for the Shabbos meals (יקרא דשבתא – lit. "preciousness of Shabbos"). The notion of covering the challah is based on giving each course a sense of newness and fanfare by allowing it to "make an entrance." Each course is therefore brought out separately, rather than having them all at the table when the meal begins. Because the challah is supposed to be on the table during kiddush, though, it is kept covered until it is ready to be served.

Now that the custom to cover the challah has been established together with its three reasons, one could ask what the nafka minnah would be between the three reasons—how would a difference in practice occur as a result of one rationale being dominant over another? Each of the following bullets represents a distinct nafka minnah:

- If the covering of the challah is because of kadima, the challah may be uncovered immediately after kiddush; if because of the manna or honor, the challah should not be uncovered just because kiddush is over, but should remain covered until after hamotzi (the blessing over the challah) is recited.
- Kiddush is not recited at the third meal. If covering the challah is because of the dew or honor, it should be covered at the third meal as well; if because of kadima, there is no wine to disrupt the sequence of blessings and no cover is necessary.
- Because the dew enveloped the manna on both the top and bottom, the challah should be covered both above and below; if because of kadima or honor, a simple napkin placed over the challah would do.
- If covering the challah is because of kadima, only food items that precede wine in the sequence of blessings should be covered at the time of kiddush or remain off the table until after kiddush. This would include only bread (which has a blessing of hamotzi) and cake (which has a blessing of mezonot); if covering is because of the dew, only challah needs to be covered; if because of honor, even gefilte fish, coleslaw and other foods on the table should be covered (or brought to the table only when their respective course begins).
- If one makes kiddush over the challah (which is not ideal, but certainly permitted if one does not have wine), there is no issue of kadima and perhaps none of honor either, and no cover should be necessary; if because of dew, the challah should still be covered.

=== Reconciliation ===
- In practice, bread is not covered except on Shabbos and Jewish holidays with Shabbos-like work restrictions because bread eaten on a weekday is not tied to the manna. It is only on Shabbos, when two loaves are required as a commemoration of the double portion of manna that was given in the wilderness in honor of Shabbos, that we link our bread to the manna that was enveloped in dew.
- Many people do not cover the other foods on the table during kiddush.
- The Mishnah Berurah asserts that when making kiddush on challah, one should place one's hands on the challah cover until one reaches the actual blessing on the bread, uncover the challah and place one's hands on the challah itself for that blessing and then recover the challah and once again grab the challah through the cover for the concluding words of the kiddush.
- Quoting the Aruch Hashulchan, Shemirat Shabbat Kehilchatah asserts that, while "it is not the custom to cover the challah during the third meal," some do indeed cover them to follow the other reasons.
