= John Morrissey (disambiguation) =

John Morrissey (1831–1878) was an American boxer and politician.

John Morrissey may also refer to:

- John Morrissey (baseball) (1856–1884), Major League Baseball player
- John Morrissey (footballer) (born 1965), English footballer
- John Morrissey (rugby union) (1939–2013), New Zealand rugby union player
- John P. Morrissey (politician) (1885–1966), New York politician
- John P. Morrissey (biologist), Irish biologist
- Johnny Morrissey (born 1940), English footballer
- John Morrissey (Australian politician), Victorian state MP from 1897 to 1907
