= Vánočka =

Czech and Slovak plaited bread

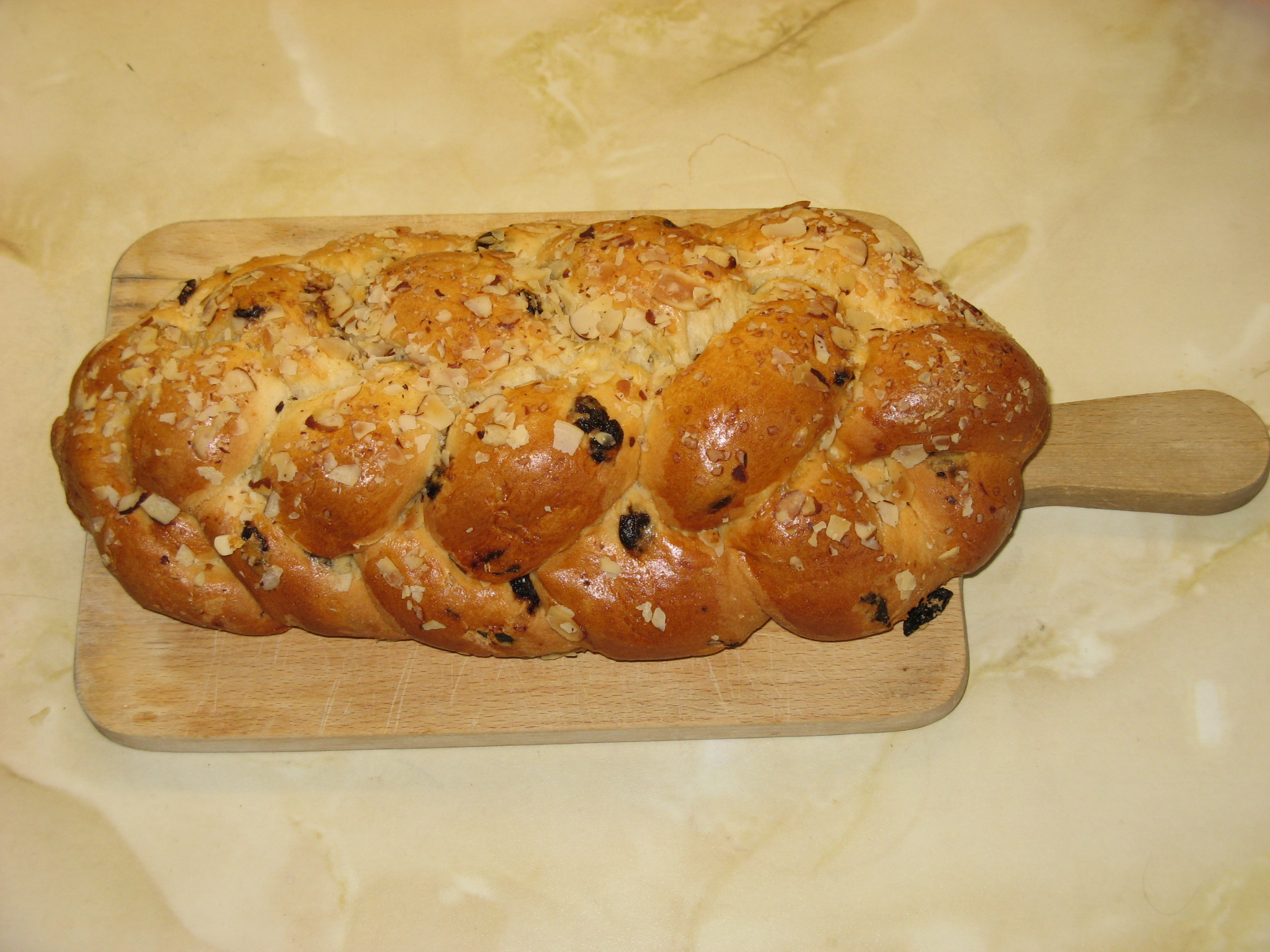
- Alternative names: Vianočka
- Type: Sweet bread
- Place of origin: Czech Republic
- Main ingredients: eggs, butter, yeast, sugar, raisins, flour, almonds

Vánočka (Czech: [ˈvaːnot͡ʃka]) is a plaited bread, baked in the Czech Republic and Slovakia (called vianočka in Slovak) traditionally around the Christmas holiday. A Christmas bread made from white flour, either in the form of a wedge or a plait, was first mentioned around 1400 by the Benedictine monk Jan of Holešov in his work Treatise on Christmas Eve. According to his interpretation, this pastry symbolized the Christ Child wrapped in cloth.

Vánočka was further referred to during the 16th century, where it could only be made by a baker who was a guild craftsman. During the 18th century, people took the recipe and began baking it at home. Made using eggs and butter, vánočka is similar to brioche. Lemon rind and rum add colour and flavour. The dough can also contain raisins and almonds, and it is plaited similarly to challah. A vánočka may be built up from three progressively smaller plaits stacked on top of one another; this is sometimes interpreted as a rough sculpture of the baby Jesus wrapped in cloth and lying in a manger.

Vánočka has a reputation for being difficult to prepare, and in many households, superstitions and special customs were attached to the baking process in the past.

The bread is named after Vánoce, meaning 'Christmas' in Czech (Vianoce in Slovak).

== See also ==
- Zopf
- Challah
- Houska
- Hefekranz
- List of sweet breads
