= Žemlička =

Žemlička (feminine: Žemličková) is a Czech surname. Žemlička means small houska. Notable people with the surname include:

- Milan Žemlička (born 1996), Czech biathlete
- Richard Žemlička (born 1964), Czech ice hockey player
