= Hefekranz =

Sweet bread from the Germanic region

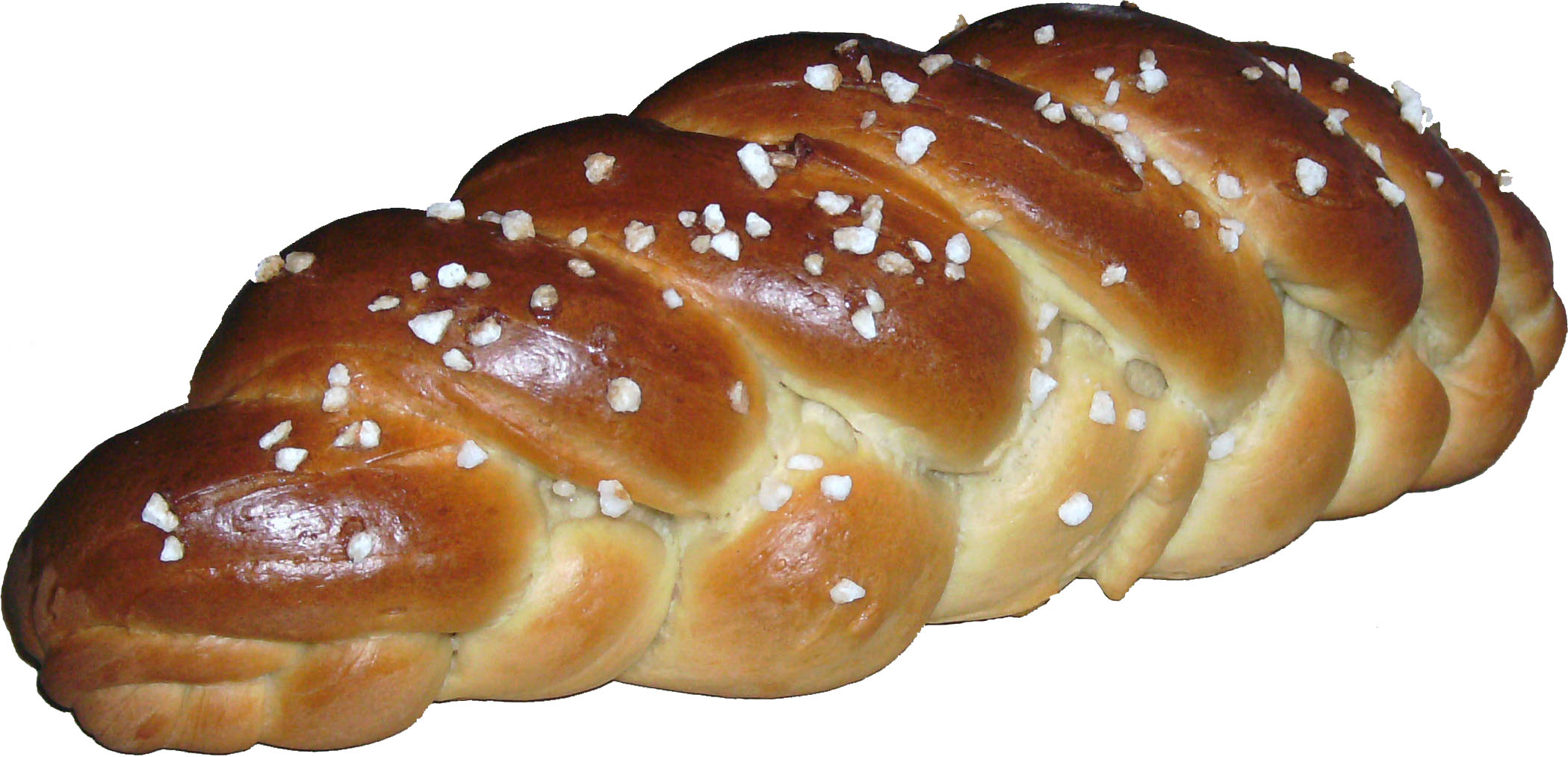
- A hefezopf loaf with five braids
- Alternative names: Hefezopf
- Type: Sweet zopf
- Main ingredients: Flour, sugar, butter, eggs, yeast

Hefekranz or Hefezopf (literally "yeast wreath" and "yeast braid") are sweet breads from Switzerland, Germany, Austria and South Tyrol.

The dough is made from sugar, flour, butter, eggs and yeast (sometimes with raisins or almonds).

Typically both Hefezopf and Hefekranz consist of three braided dough-pieces. While the Hefezopf ("Zopf" meaning braid) is a loaf consisting only of a braid, the Hefekranz' braid is bent into a wreath ("Kranz" meaning wreath).

Two similar kinds of bread called vetekrans and vetelängd (literally "wheat wreath" and "wheat length" respectively) are common in Sweden. Vetelängd is shapewise very similar to the Hefezopf, whereas the vetekrans' two ends are joined, shaping the bread into an O-shape, prior to baking.

== See also ==
- Challah
- Zopf – unsweetened Swiss variant
- Vánočka – Czech and Slovak variant
- Scallion bread
- List of sweet breads
