= Be-mai peligei =

Be-mai peligei (Aramaic: במאי פליגי) is a phrase used in legal debates in the Talmud, meaning On what do they disagree?

It is used in explaining the difference between two views of the law (usually as expressed by two different rabbis). The implication is that they agree on the practical result but differ on the source text or legal principle forming the rationale for that result.

It is contrasted with the question Mai nafka minnah, "What goes out from it?", which indicates that in a distinction between two or more legal opinions or conceptual categories, there must be some practical effect that emerges from the distinct categories as conceived. In other words, nafka minnah concerns the tachlis or "bottom line".

An example of be-mai peligei occurs at Temurah 6a, where Rava and Abaye are discussing whether a transaction which breaches a religious law can have any legal validity, Rava holding that in general it does not and Abaye holding that it does. However, in a series of examples drawn from different fields of law it is found that they agree on the practical result in every case. "So on what do they disagree?" Rava holds that, while the general principle is that such transactions are invalid, exceptionally they are valid where there is an indication to this effect in the Biblical text. Abaye holds that, while the general principle is that such transactions are valid, exceptionally they are invalid where there is an indication to this effect in the Biblical text. In other words, they agree on the lists of examples but differ on which is the general rule and which is the exception.
