= Sensient Technologies =

Manufacturer of Fragrances

Sensient Technologies Corporation
- Type: Public
- Traded as: NYSE: SXT; S&P 600 Component
- Industry: Colors, Flavors and Fragrance
- Founded: 1882
- Headquarters: U.S. Bank Center; Milwaukee, Wisconsin
- Key people: Paul Manning, CEO
- Products: Colors, Flavors and Fragrances
- Revenue: ▲US$1.61 billion (2025)
- Number of employees: 3,986 worldwide
- Website: www.sensient.com

Sensient Technologies is a global manufacturer and marketer of colors, flavors and fragrances based in Milwaukee, Wisconsin. Their products are used in many foods and beverages, pharmaceuticals, cosmetics, home and personal care products, specialty printing and imaging products, computer imaging and industrial colors. In 2021, Sensient was ranked 10th on the Global Top 50 Food Flavors and Fragrances Companies list.

== History ==
Sensient Technologies was founded in 1882 as Meadow Springs Distilling Company. In the late 19th century, the company changed its name to National Distilling Company. By 1919 the company was threatened by prohibition but by then it had created a business selling yeast under the Red Star Yeast brand. Accordingly, the company changed its name to Red Star Yeast and Products Company.

By the 1960s, the company had become a highly diversified food company and changed its name again to Universal Foods Corporation. In 1977 the company listed its stock on the New York Stock Exchange (SXT).

In 1984 Sensient acquired Warner-Jenkinson Co. (color applications). Together with some other acquisitions this developed into the cosmetic color division. This division is now called 'Sensient Cosmetic Technologies'.

Kenneth P. Manning, Sensient Technologies' Chairman and CEO, joined the company in 1987 as Group Vice President. When Manning was named CEO of Universal Foods in 1996, he accelerated its expansion by making strategic acquisitions. Since 1997, the corporation has acquired 20 companies.

In 2000 Universal Foods changed its name to Sensient Technologies Corporation. Following this name change, Sensient sold Red Star Yeast in 2001.

Sensient Natural Ingredients received Non-GMO Project Verification for its California-grown garlic, onion and parsley in March 2016.

Sensient is a member of the European Flavour Association. The company does not test its products or raw materials on animals except when required by law.

== Sources ==
- FrontFour Believes Real Change Is Needed At Sensient Technologies - New York Times
- FrontFour Expresses Serious Concerns Regarding Sensient Technologies' Director Elaine Wedral's Apparent Conflict Of Interest - New York Times
- Sensient Responds to FrontFour Statement - New York Times
- Sensient Technologies Corporation Announces New President of Flavors Business - New York Times
- Sensient Announces Preliminary Results of Annual Meeting - New York Times
- Sensient Technologies averts board takeover - Milwaukee Business Journal
