= Houska =

Traditional Czech bread roll

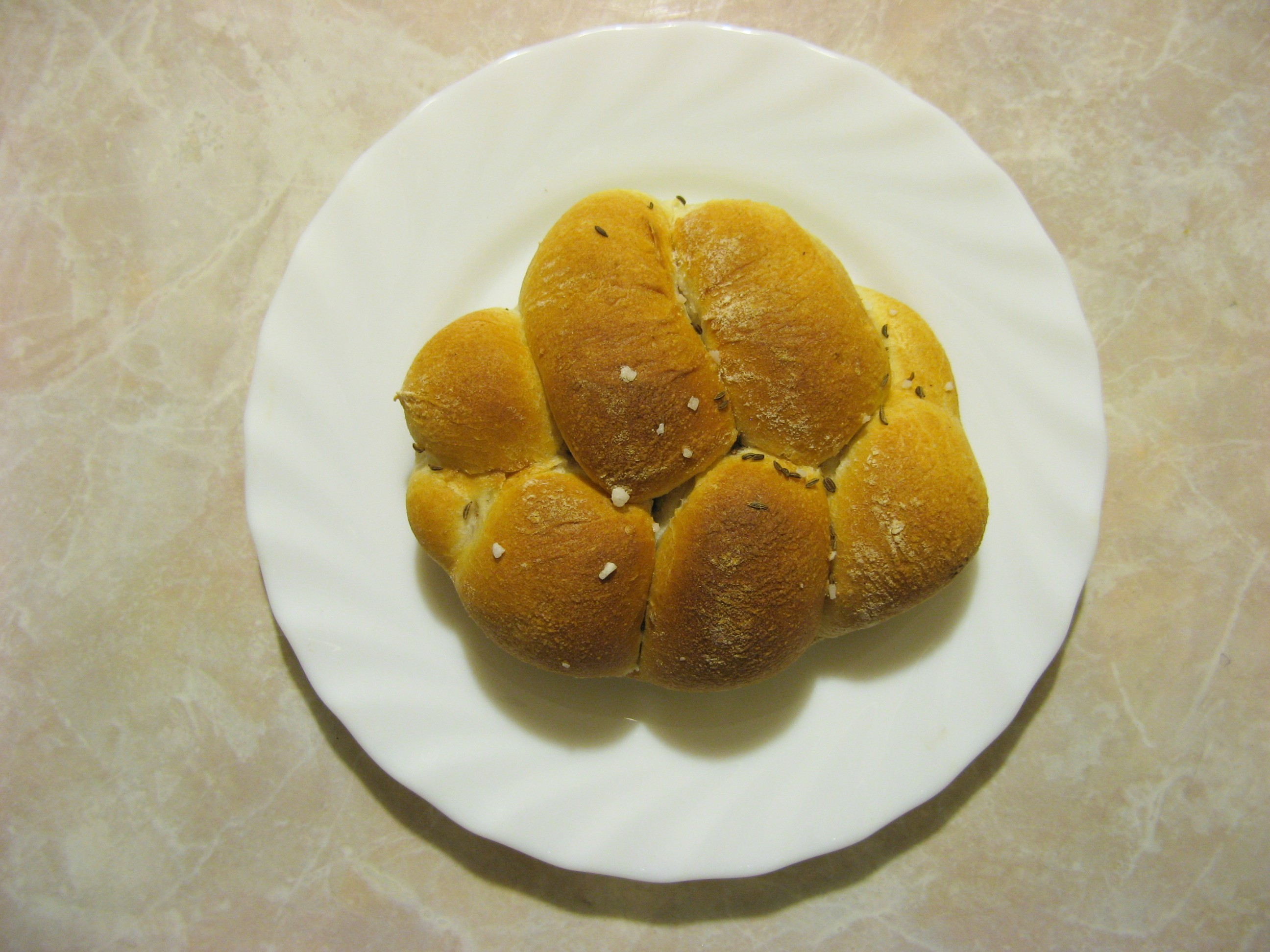
- Type: Bread roll
- Place of origin: Czech Republic, Poland, Slovakia, Hungary, Germany, Austria
- Region or state: Bavaria
- Main ingredients: Wheat flour, water, yeast, salt; poppy seeds, caraway seeds or sea salt

Houska is a traditional bread roll baked and consumed in the Czech Republic. Typical ingredients include wheat flour (but other types can be used), water, yeast and salt. They are topped with poppy seeds, caraway seeds, linseeds or sea salt. Rohlík is another form, similar or identical in ingredients, production, taste, size and price.

A 2003 issue of the Culinary Historians of Chicago newsletter published a "houska bread" recipe from Chicago Tribune feature writer Judy Hevrdejs. This was described as a lightly sweetened, traditional bread loaf. The recipe contained a significant amount of sugar, eggs and cream, raisins, and was covered in blanched almonds.

== See also ==
- Vánočka
- List of bread rolls
