= Eckhard Boles =

German microbiologist and biotechnologist

Eckhard Boles (born September 4, 1963, in Altena) is a German microbiologist and biotechnologist. Since 2002 he is professor of microbiology at the Goethe University Frankfurt with a focus on the physiology and genetics of lower eukaryotes. He retired in September 2024. He works mainly on the optimization of yeasts for industrial biotechnology.

== Life and work ==
Eckhard Boles was born in 1963 in Altena in North Rhine-Westphalia, Germany, and graduated from Burggymnasium Altena in 1983. From 1985 to 1990, he studied Chemistry and Biology at the University of Cologne and completed his studies with a diploma in Biology with a diploma thesis on the uptake and secretion of amino acids in Corynebacterium glutamicum at the Institute for Biotechnology of the Forschungszentrum Jülich ("Jülich Research Centre") in the research group of Reinhard Krämer. From 1990 to 1994, Boles worked as a scientific assistant at the Institute of Microbiology and Genetics at the Technical University of Darmstadt in the research group of Friedrich K. Zimmermann, where he received his doctorate in 1994 with a thesis on the regulation of glycolysis in Saccharomyces cerevisiae.

Until 1995, he stayed at the TH Darmstadt as a post-doctoral fellow and worked on the function of fructose-2,6-bisphosphate in the glycolysis of baker's yeast. From 1996 to 2001 he worked as a scientific assistant (C1) at the Institute for Microbiology at the University of Düsseldorf; until 2000, he worked on his habilitation on glucose transport and metabolism in yeasts. He received his Venia Legendi in 2001 and remained as a senior assistant (C2) at the University of Düsseldorf until 2002. In 2002, he moved to the Goethe University in Frankfurt, where he was appointed to a chair as C3 Professor of Microbiology. From November 2011 till September 2024 he was W3 Professor of Microbiology with a focus on Physiology and Genetics of Lower Eukaryotes at the same institute.

In the summer of 2007, Boles co-founded Butalco GmbH, Zug, Switzerland, together with Gunter Festel. In 2012 Butalco sold its xylose technology to the French yeast producer Lesaffre, which wanted to become the world market leader for yeast for the production of first-generation cereal-based bioethanol and also active in the second generation sector. Two years later Lesaffre took over Butalco completely and integrated it into the Lesaffre group as an independent unit. Boles was also co-founder of the biotechnology company Gothia Yeast Solutions in Gothenburg, Sweden.

== Research topics ==
The research work of Eckhard Boles and his research group focuses on the investigation of general metabolic and regulatory processes of yeasts as well as the development of technologies to improve the applications of yeasts in biotechnology. The research focuses on

- the biotechnological production of butanol and aromatic compounds
- the biotechnological production of short-chain fatty acids, higher alcohols and polyketides
- C5 technologies: Fermentation of pentoses with recombinant yeast cells
- Sugar uptake and human glucose transporters
- Synthetic organelles and channeling concepts

== Bibliography (selection) ==
Eckhard Boles regularly publishes articles on his research activities in scientific journals. These are contributions to original research as well as review articles on central topics in molecular biology and biotechnology.

- E. Boles: Molekulargenetische und physiologische Untersuchungen zur Regulation des Kohlenhydratstoffwechsels in Glykolysemutanten der Hefe "Saccharomyces cerevisiae" / eingereicht von Eckhard Boles. Technische Hochschule Darmstadt, Dissertation 1994.
- R. Wieczorke, S. Krampe, T. Weierstall, K. Freidel, C.P. Hollenberg, E. Boles: Concurrent knock‐out of at least 20 transporter genes is required to block uptake of hexoses in Saccharomyces cerevisiae. FEBS letters 464 (3), 1999; S. 123–128. doi:10.1016/S0014-5793(99)01698-1
- E. Boles, R. Krämer: Molecular Mechanisms Controlling Transmembrane Transport. Series Topics in Current Genetics, Vol 9, Springer Verlag, 2004. ISBN 978-3-540-21837-1
- D. Brat, E. Boles, B. Wiedemann: Functional expression of a bacterial xylose isomerase in Saccharomyces cerevisiae. Applied and Environmental Microbiology 75 (8), 2009; S. 2304–2311. doi:10.1128/AEM.02522-08
- C. Weber, A. Farwick, F. Benisch, D. Brat, H. Dietz, T. Subtil, E. Boles: Trends and challenges in the microbial production of lignocellulosic bioalcohol fuels. Applied Microbiology and Biotechnology 87 (4), 2010; S. 1303–1315. doi:10.1007/s00253-010-2707-z
- M. Gottardi, M. Reifenrath, E. Boles, J. Tripp: Pathway engineering for the production of heterologous aromatic chemicals and their derivatives in Saccharomyces cerevisiae: bioconversion from glucose. FEMS Yeast Research 17 (4), 1. Juni 2017; fox035.doi:10.1093/femsyr/fox035
- W.C. Generoso, V. Schadeweg, M. Oreb, E. Boles: Metabolic engineering of Saccharomyces cerevisiae for production of butanol isomers. Current Opinion on Biotechnology 33, 2017; S. 1–7. doi:10.1016/j.copbio.2014.09.004.
- Leonie Baumann, Arun S. Rajkumar, John P. Morrissey, Eckhard Boles, Mislav Oreb: A Yeast-Based Biosensor for Screening of Short- and Medium-Chain Fatty Acid Production. ACS Synthetic Biology 7 (11), 2018; pp 2640–2646. doi:10.1021/acssynbio.8b00309.
