= Hospodine, pomiluj ny =

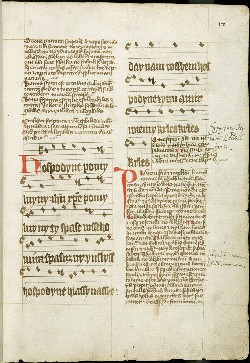
The oldest preserved complete transcription of the hymn from the late 14th century

Hospodine pomiluj ny (English: Lord, Have Mercy on Us) is the oldest known Czech song. The hymn is a paraphrase of the Kyrie Eleison with deep choral melody. Its text preserves traces of Church Slavonic origin.

== History ==
Author of the song, dating from the turn of 10/11th century, is unknown, but authorship is usually attributed to the Czech saint, missionary and martyr Svatý Vojtěch (St. Adalbert of Prague). The text has simple form with eight verses, without rhyme or stanzas. Its definitive version comes from time when Old Church Slavonic competed with Latin and absorbed Czech components.

First mention of the choral comes from 1055 when it was sung during election of duke Spytihněv II of Bohemia. The oldest recording appears in chronicle of Jan from Holešov from 1397. It was also sung during celebrations and as a war song. Charles IV used it during his coronation, Jan Hus during sermons given in Bethlehem Chapel in Prague. Together with Saint Wenceslas Chorale it is one of the first Czech national anthems. The song, almost unmodified, is still used during liturgy.

== Text ==
In modern Czech orthography: ^{explanatory notes}

Hospodine pomiluj ny
Hospodine, pomiluj ny,
Jezu Kriste, pomiluj ny,
ty Spase všeho míra,
spasiž ny, i uslyšiž,
Hospodine, hlasy nášě;
daj nám všém, Hospodine,
žizň a mír v zemi;
žizň a mír v zemi.
Krleš, Krleš, Krleš!

Latin translation: ^{source}

O Domine, miserere
O Domine, miserere,
Iesu Christe, miserere,
Salus es totius mundi,
salva nos et percipe,
o Domine, voces nostras;
da cunctis, o Domine,
panem, pacem terrae;
panem, pacem terrae.
Kyrie eleison!

(translated by M. B. Boleluczky)

English translation: ^{source}

Lord! have mercy upon us.
Lord! have mercy upon us.
Jesus Christ! have mercy upon us.
Thou, Saviour of the whole world,
Save us, and listen,
Lord! to our voices.
Give us all, O Lord,
Plenteousness and peace on earth.
Kyrie Eleison!

(translated by John Bowring)

== Notes ==
- God, Have Mercy on Us is sometimes seen as English translation of the name.
- Several Czech classical music authors used the song as a model for their works, for example Miloslav Kabeláč in his "Metamorphoses I and II of Old Czech song Lord, have mercy of us". Metamorphoses I is the composition for symphonic orchestra and piano, Matamorphoses II are the "a capella" variations. Also Leoš Janáček used this theme in one of his works - Hospodine, pomiluj ny (Lord Have Mercy Upon Us) for Solo Quartet and Mixed Double Choir with accompaniment of Organ, Harp, 3 Trumpet, 4 Trombons and Tuba.
