= Challah cover =

Special cloth used for Ashkenazi Shabbat and holidays

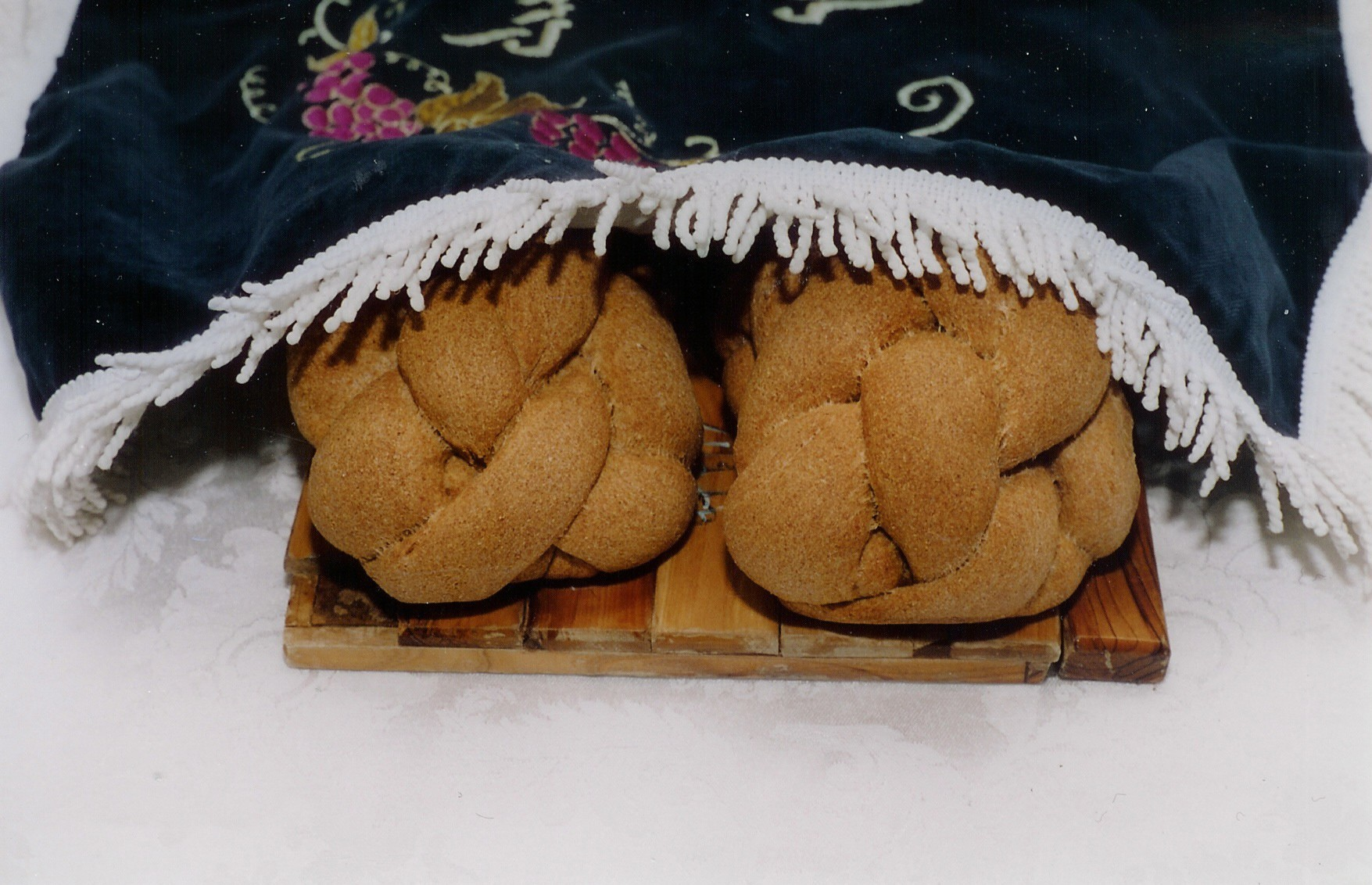
Two homemade challot placed on cutting board covered by an embroidered challah cover

A challah cover is a special cloth used to cover the two braided loaves (Hebrew: חַלָּה, romanized: challah; pl. חלוֹת, challot) set out on the table at the beginning of an Ashkenazi Shabbat or Yom Tov meal. While its appearance lends a decorative and ceremonial aspect to the set table, its presence serves both a halakhic and symbolic function.

== Description ==
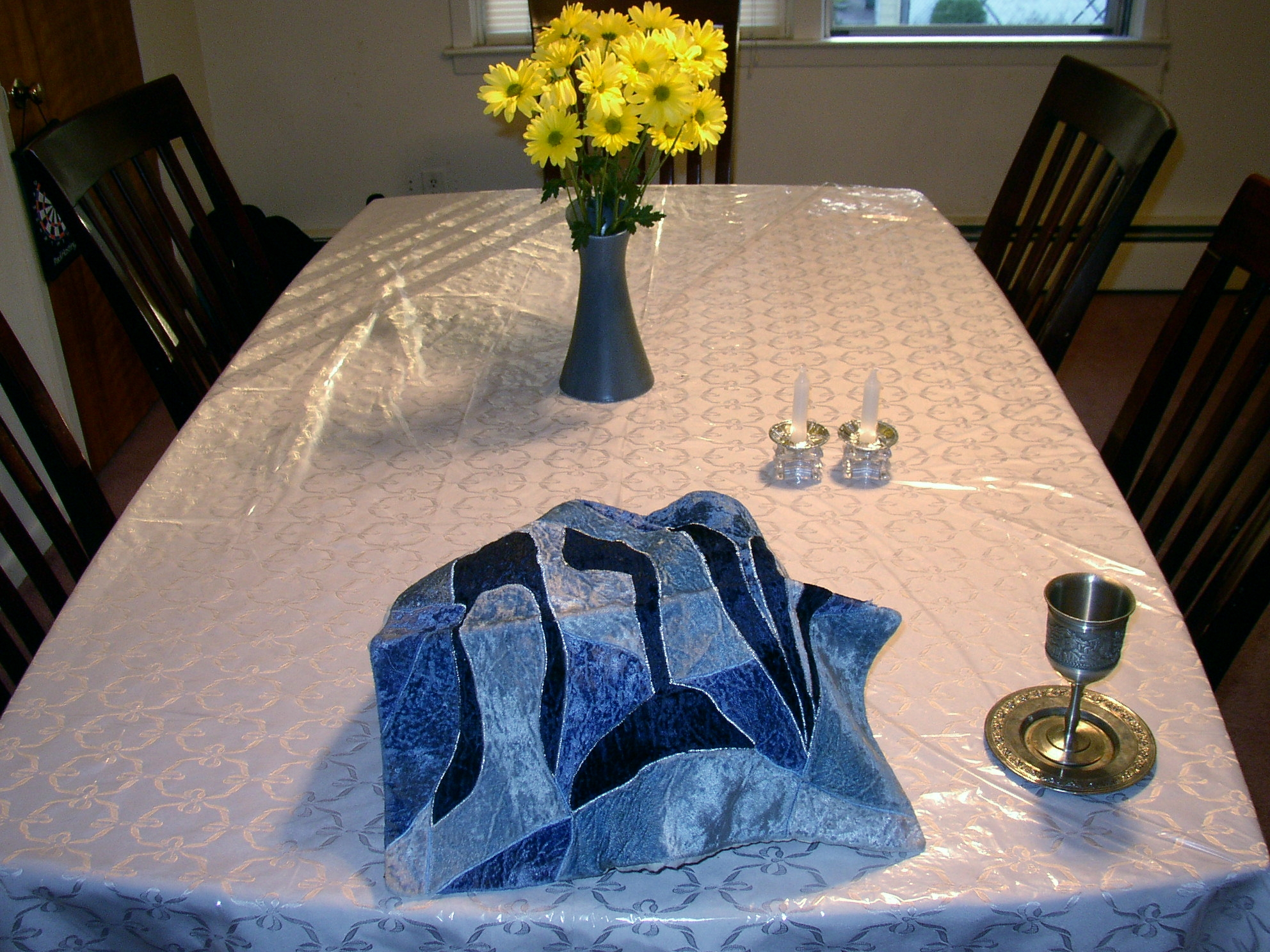
A challah cover on a table set for Shabbat

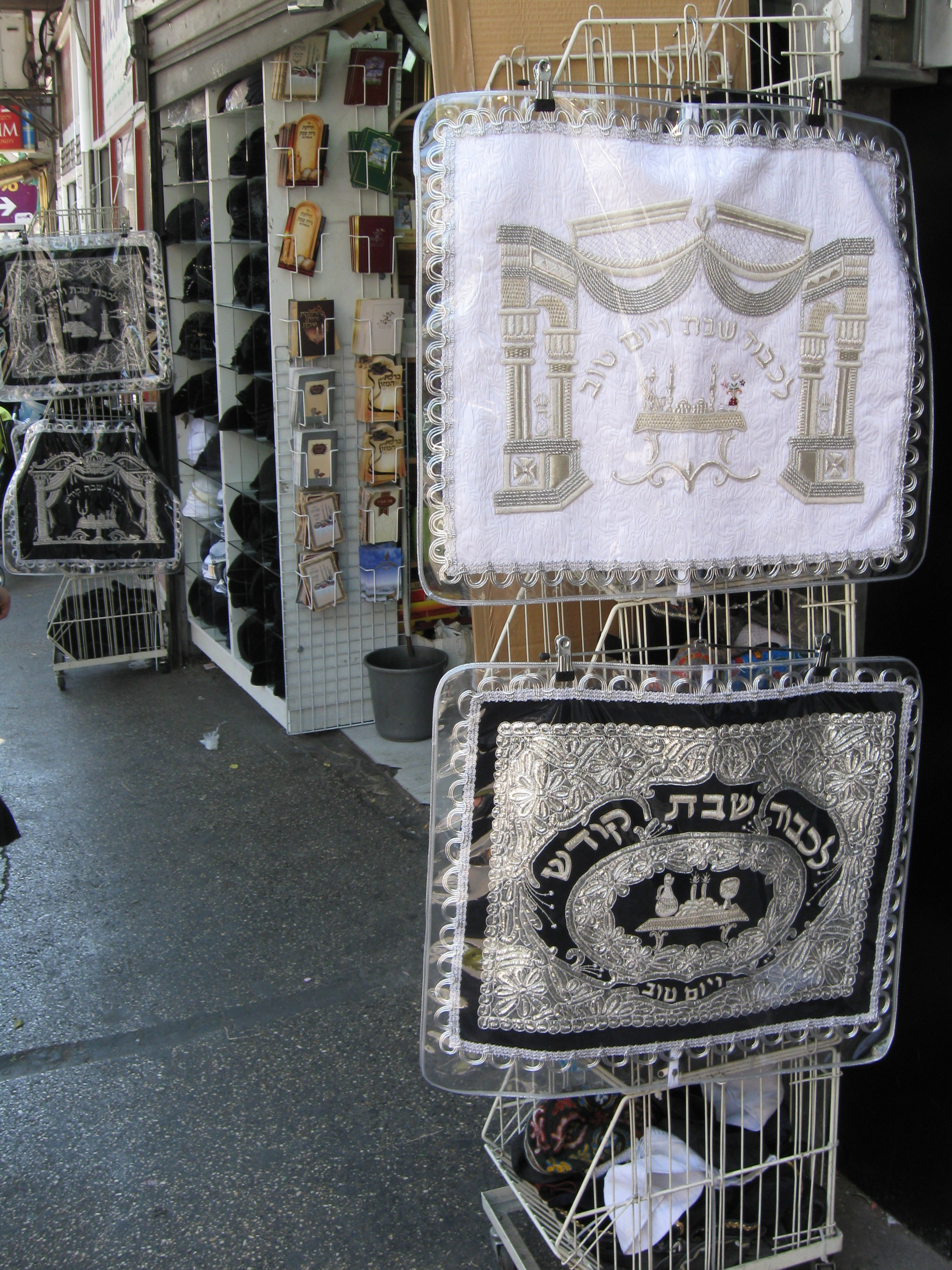
Challah covers for sale outside a store in Jerusalem. The inscription on the top cover says "To honor Shabbat and Yom Tov". The inscription on the bottom says "To honor the holy Shabbat".

Challah covers may be made from any kind of fabric or paper. They are often hand or machine-embroidered, painted, appliqued or tie-dyed. They are sometimes adorned with fringes interwoven with silver or gold thread. The challah cover must be large enough to cover two braided loaves without allowing the bread to be seen through the sides, and opaque enough so that the loaves cannot be seen through the fabric. Store-bought challah covers often bear the inscription לכבוד שבת קדש ("To honor the holy Shabbat") or לכבוד שבת ויום טוב ("To honor Shabbat and Yom Tov").

== Halakhic function ==
At the beginning of a Shabbat or holiday meal, a blessing (Kiddush) must preferably be made over the wine first in order to sanctify the Shabbat. This is followed by the blessing over the bread (challah), which begins the meal. However, in the hierarchy of blessings mandated by the Sages, the blessing over bread should precede the blessing over wine. In order to preserve the priority of the wine, and not to "shame" the bread which should be blessed first, the bread is “removed” by concealing it from view with the challah cover.

In the absence of a challah cover, one may use a napkin, doily, tissues, or similar covering.

== Symbolism ==
=== Remembrance of the manna ===
The placement of the challah under the challah cover and over the Shabbat tablecloth (or over a challah cutting board) also recalls the Biblical scene of the manna which the Israelites ate every day following the Exodus from Egypt. When Moses told the people about the manna, he said that it would fall for them every day of the week. However, in deference to the holiness of Shabbat, the manna would not fall on that day. Instead, two portions of manna would fall on Friday, enough for that day and for the Shabbat (Exodus 16:22-26). This is given as the reason for the use of two braided loaves at Shabbat and holiday meals, as the challot represent the double portion of manna that fell in honor of Shabbat.

Each morning the Israelites found the manna in the fields, encased in two layers of dew to preserve its freshness. Rashi describes the way the manna was found:

Thus we see that the dew fell upon the ground and the manna fell upon it, and then dew fell again upon this, and so it was as though it were carefully packed in a chest (Rashi on Exodus 16:13, quoting Mechilta, Yoma 75b).

Thus, we place the challot beneath a challah cover and over a tablecloth (or challah board) to recreate the miracle of the manna at our own Shabbat tables.

== History ==
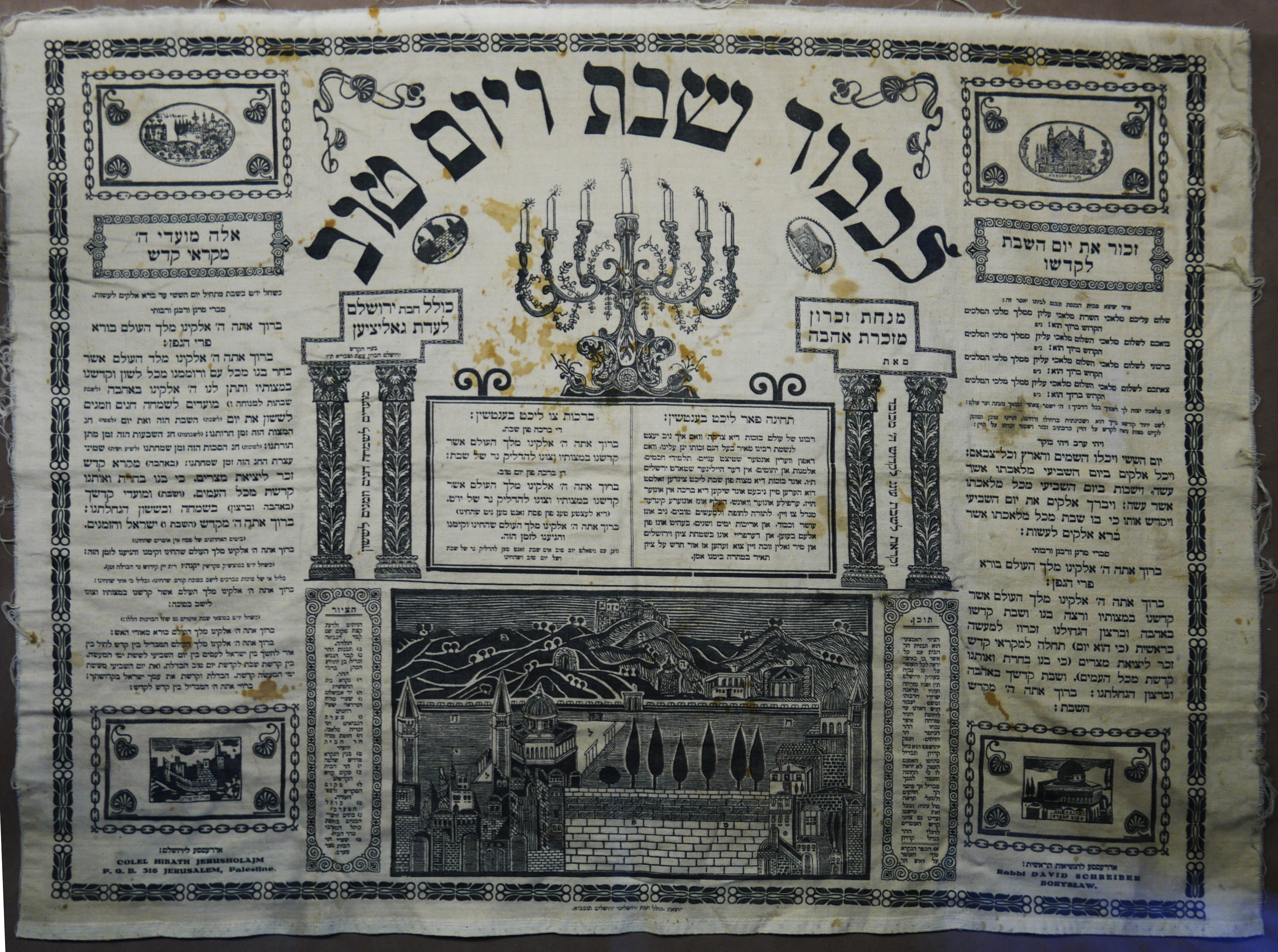
Old challah cover, Boryslav, Poland, c. 1930

In Talmudic times, food was served to banquet guests on three-legged trays rather than tables. These trays were brought to each guest by waiters. On Shabbat, the trays would be brought out only after the Kiddush, to show that the meal was being served in honor of the Shabbat, which had just been sanctified by the recital of the Kiddush. Today, Ashkenazi Jews set the table with the challah, but cover it until the time when it would have been carried in, in Talmudic times. This demonstrates that the meal only begins after — and because of — the Kiddush.

Covering the challah so as not to "shame" it while the wine is being blessed has been cited as an object lesson for the importance of not shaming one's fellow humans. The following story is told about Rabbi Yisroel Salanter:

Rabbi Yisroel was once stranded in Kovno for Shabbat. Everyone wanted to host him, but he chose to spend the Shabbat at the home of a baker who had no children to feed, so he would not take away anyone's portion of food. The baker was an observant Jew but hardly a man of intelligence.

As he ushered his esteemed guest into his house, he shouted at his wife, "Why are the challahs not covered? How many times must I remind you to cover the challahs?" The poor woman, recognizing her distinguished guest, hurried to cover the challahs with tears in her eyes.

When the baker asked Rabbi Yisroel to do the honors by reciting the Kiddush, the Rabbi first asked him, "Can you tell me why we cover the challahs?"

"Of course," replied the baker. "Every child knows the answer. When there are many different foods on the table, the first blessing is always made over the bread, after which no other blessing need be made. On Friday night, however, the first blessing has to be made over the wine. In order not to shame the challah, who expects the blessing to be made over her, we must cover her over until after the sanctification of the wine."

Rabbi Yisroel looked at the baker incredulously. "Why do your ears not hear what your mouth is saying?" he asked. "Do you think that our Jewish tradition does not understand that a piece of dough has no feelings and would never become embarrassed? Understand that our laws are trying to sensitize us to the feelings of human beings, our friends, our neighbors, and especially our wives!"

== Matzo covers ==
At the Passover seder, the matzos are also covered. Ashkenazi Matzo covers differ from challah covers in that they can contain three "pockets" into which the three matzot (set out at the beginning of the Seder) are inserted.

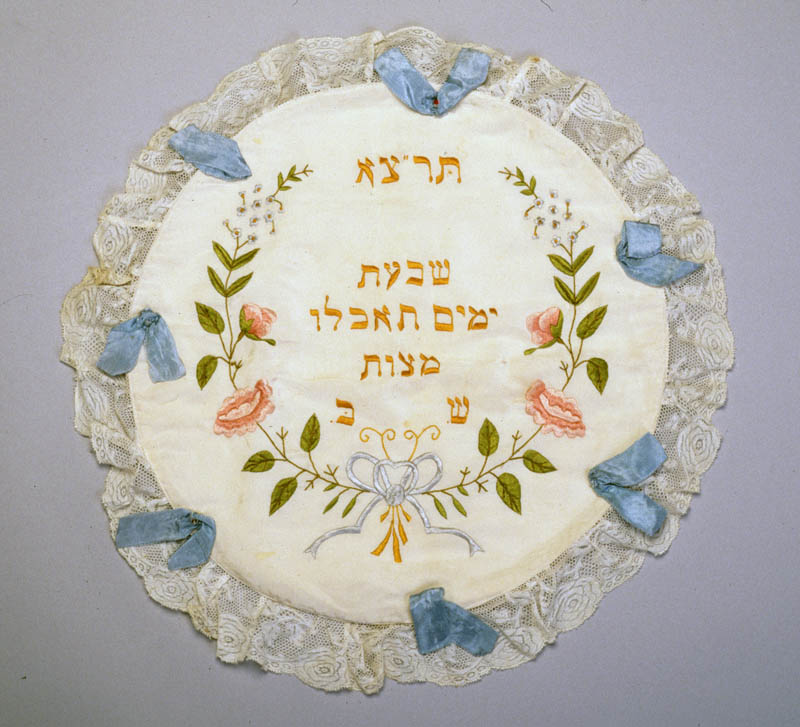
Matzo cover, circa 1930s

According to the Gemara, matzo is called lechem oni (poor man's bread); the Hebrew word oni (עוני) can also be construed as "answers," yielding, "bread upon which answers are spoken." Thus, the matzos are uncovered during the telling of the story of the Jews' servitude in Egypt. However, when the wine cups are raised to express praise to God for the redemption, the matzos are covered so that they will not be "shamed", as one is giving preference to the wine.
