= Mouna =

Algerian sweet bread

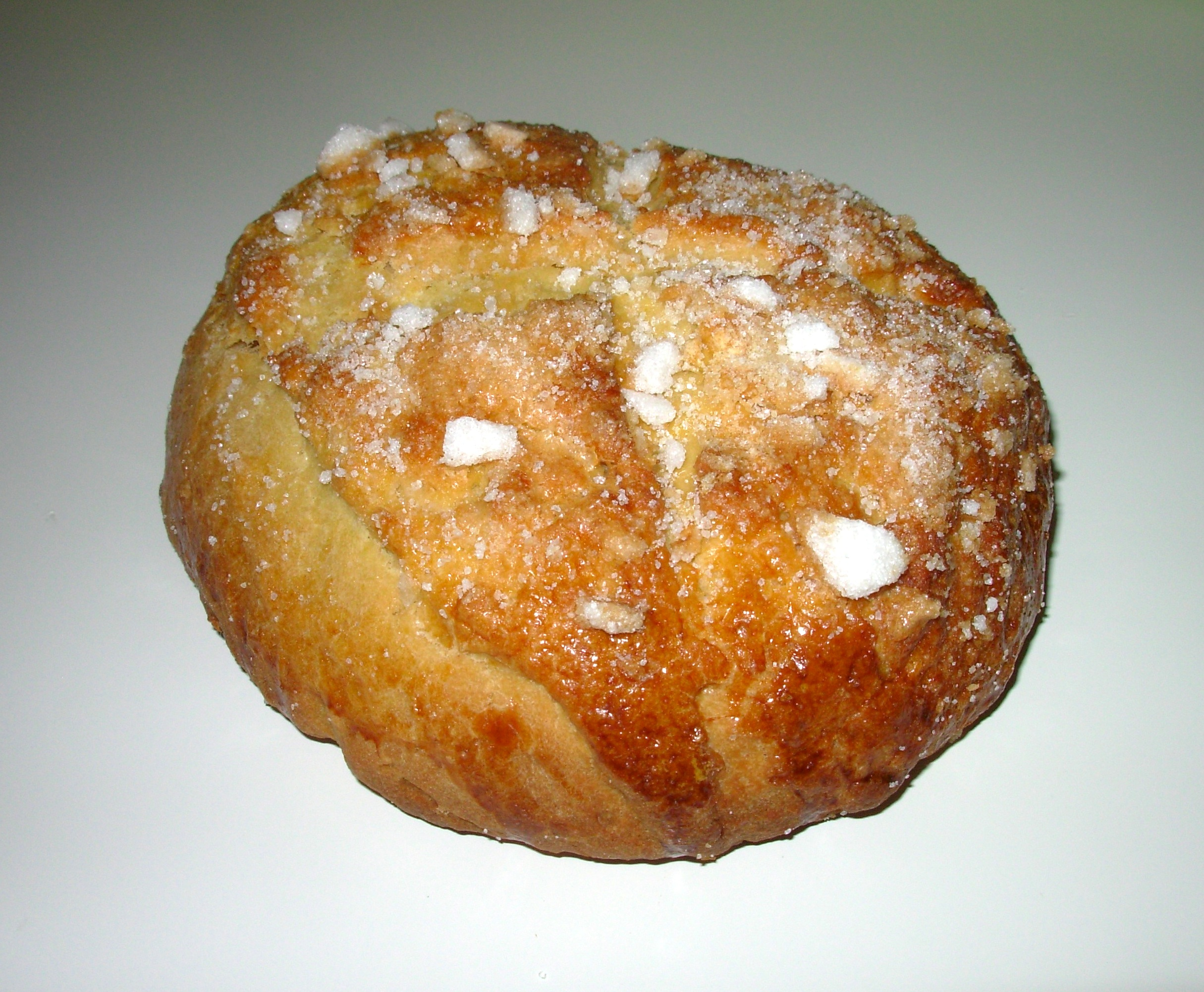
- Picture of Mouna
- Type: Viennoiserie
- Place of origin: Algeria
- Region or state: Algeria
- Main ingredients: Eggs, fine white flour, water, yeast, sugar, anise, orange zest or juice, lemon zest of juice, sesame seeds, confectioner's sugar and salt

Mouna or Mona, also known as Lamona or Khobz soltani is an Algerian orange scented brioche that is indigenous to the city of Oran. It has a sweet taste enriched with oil and eggs and often contains anise, sesame, orange or other citrus. The Pieds noirs, who introduced it into France in the 1960s, tend to eat it at Easter.

== Etymology ==
The Mouna, or Mona, being similar to the Spanish Mona de Pascua, led to some claims that this brioche was brought by the Valencians to Oran.

Another hypothesis relates the name of the brioche to that of the fort built by the first Spanish governor, Don Diego, Marquis de Comarez, at the very place of the landing; this fort was called Castillo de la Mona (Guenon castle, which became Fort de la Moune, then Fort Lamoune), because, it is said, the entirely wooded place was inhabited by bands of monkeys (mona in Spanish). For the feast of Easter, the families would have passed cakes to the prisoners of the fort, stuck on long poles, which would have taken the name of the place.

A third hypothesis suggests that Mouna was named after Fort Lamoune because the people of Oran used to go for a picnic near this it, at Easter.

Henri Chemouilli, for his part, relates mouna to mimouna, probably from the Arabic imoun ("happy"), which is the name of the last day of the Jewish Passover.

According to André Lanly, mouna comes from the Valencian mona, which derives from the Latin adjective munda in the expression munda annona, which designated luxury bread in the Roman army. In popular Algerian language, mouna also refers to a blow to the cheek (to put a mouna on someone).

For Pierre Mannoni, whatever the form of the mouna, the important thing lies in the tradition of the picnic where it is eaten and that this custom, which is found everywhere in Algeria, constitutes a celebration of spring, a "rite more pagan than Christian no doubt". He joined Joëlle Hureau for whom "to do the mouna is to sacrifice to a rite".

== Preparation ==
It is a viennoiserie dough made of flour, water, milk and baker's yeast, to which oil, orange juice and zest (or orange blossom) is added. The dough is made into a ball which is brushed with egg yolk beaten with a little milk and the top of which is covered with pieces of crushed sugar. It is then placed on a large sheet metal tray, are then baked in the oven.
