= Lesaffre =

Manufacturing company in France

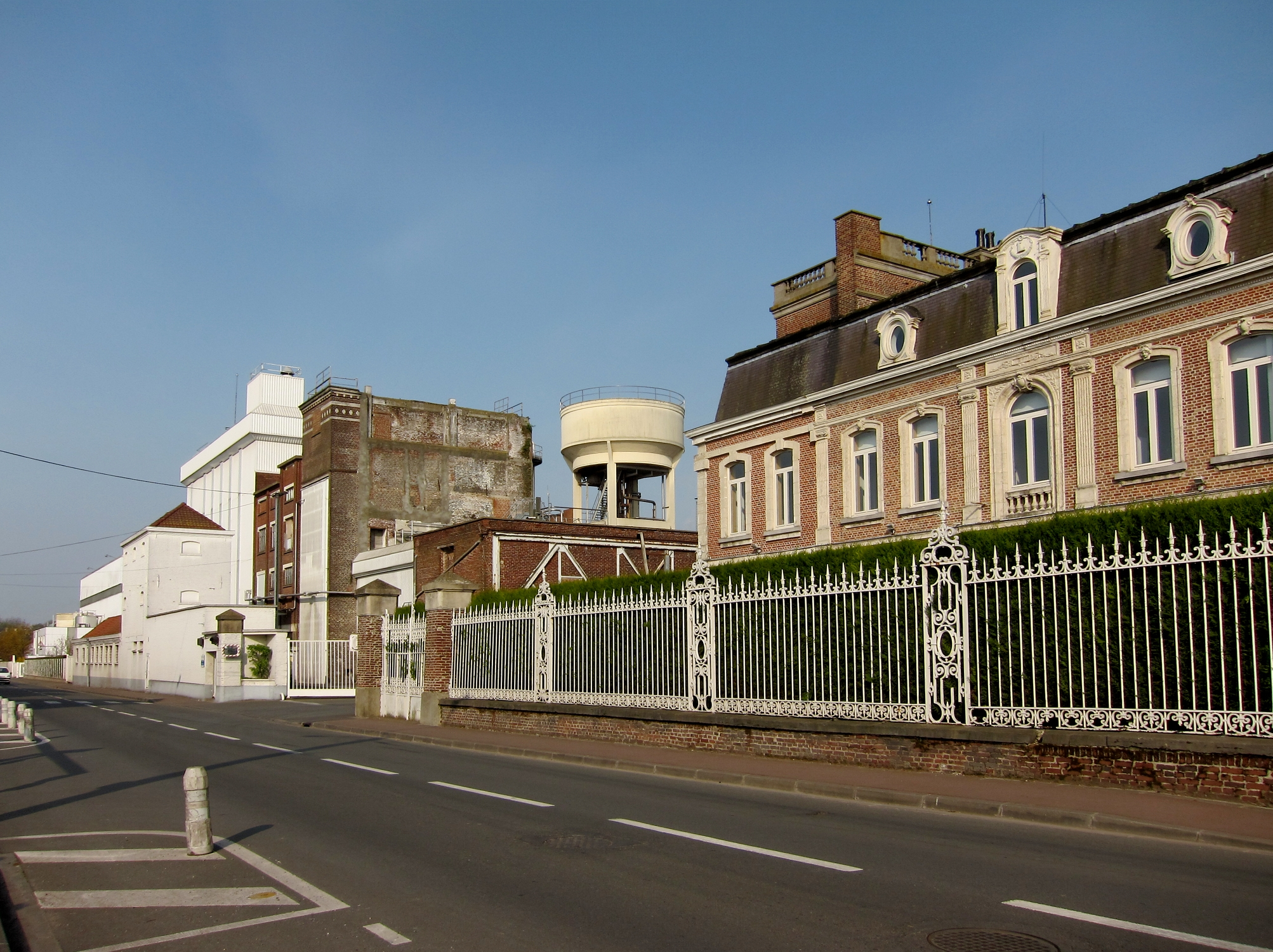
- Historic facilities of the company in Marcq-en-Barœul
- Type: Private
- Industry: Food
- Founder: Louis Lesaffre
- Headquarters: Marcq-en-Barœul
- Website: www.lesaffre.com

Lesaffre is a French yeast manufacturer, and the world's largest producer.

== History ==
The company was founded by Louis Lesaffre, the co-founder of Bonduelle, in the mid-19th century.

One of its subsidiaries, Bio Springer, was founded by Baron Max de Springer in 1872 in Maisons-Alfort.

In 2004, it formed a North American joint-venture with Archer Daniels Midland, known as Red Star Yeast.

In 2006, the end of the malt business, via its subsidiary International Malting Company (IMC), then the fifth largest maltster in the world, created tension among the family shareholders. IMC was acquired at 100% by ADM.

In 2007, it was the world's largest producer of yeast. In 2011, it bought the factory of "Voronezh Yeast" LLC in Voronezh.

After the foundation of the Lesaffre Advanced Fermentations (LEAF) subsidiary, the Swiss biofuel start-up Butalco, founded by Eckhard Boles and Gunter Festel, was acquired in July 2014. With this acquisition, Lesaffre entered the market for second generation, waste-based bioethanol and biobutanol.

Lesaffre business units include: Biospringer, Fermentis, and Ennolys (Food, Taste & Pleasure); Gnosis, Phileo, and Agrauxine (Healthcare); and Leaf, Procelys, and LIS (Industrial Biotechnology).

In 2014, it had an annual turnover of 1.5 billion euros, 7,700 employees and 80 subsidiaries in various countries. The capital is not listed on the stock exchange, but shared among 400 shareholders from the founders' family, whose professional fortune is estimated at 3 billion euros.

In 2018, the group took control of Tunisian Rayen Food Industries, which specializes in the production of baker's yeast, and of a Serbian Alltech plant specializing in yeast extracts.

In 2021, it was ranked 8th on FoodTalks' list of Top 30 Global Probiotic Food Ingredient Companies. According to current data, the company generates annual sales of €2 billion with more than 10,000 employees and 80 subsidiaries in 50 countries.

In 2024, it acquired the control of Brazilian yeast products manufacturer Biorigin from Zilor group.

== Controversies ==
=== Biospringer plant in Maisons-Alfort ===
In March 2025, residents launched a petition regarding the odors, although it received only limited support. In September 2025, the company undertook technical works intended to reduce the nuisance, but complaints from nearby residents continued through December.

On 6 April 2023, two ammonia leaks were detected in a storage tank at the facility, resulting in minor injuries to two workers. The following day, approximately 500 residents living near the site were instructed to remain indoors as a precaution, and nearby schools were temporarily closed.

On 14 November 2024, the prefecture of Val-de-Marne imposed an administrative fine of €15,000 on the company for exceeding authorized limits on water withdrawals from the Seine between 2016 and 2024.
