= Red Star Yeast =

American baking and brewing company

Red Star Yeast Company, LLC
- Type: Private
- Industry: Baking, Brewing
- Founded: 2004
- Headquarters: Milwaukee, Wisconsin, U.S.
- Area served: North America
- Products: yeast
- Revenue: $29 Million
- Owner: Lesaffre and Archer Daniels Midland Company
- Website: www.redstaryeast.com

Red Star Yeast Company, LLC is a joint-venture of Lesaffre and Archer Daniels Midland.

Red Star operates two plants in the United States—a plant in Headland, Alabama, and a plant built in 2006 in Cedar Rapids, Iowa. Lesaffre Yeast Corporation (prior to the joint venture) used to operate plants in Milwaukee, Wisconsin; Baltimore, Maryland; and Oakland, California, but those facilities have been closed since 2006. Their corporate office is located in Milwaukee.

Red Star Yeast and Products was the former division of Sensient Technologies (formerly Universal Foods), which distributed the Red Star brand. Red Star Yeast was then sold to French-based Lesaffre Group in 2001. In 2004, Lesaffre and Archer Daniels Midland Company (ADM) created the joint venture that the company operates under today.

All Red Star Yeast products are certified kosher except for Passover.
