= John P. Morrissey (biologist) =

Irish molecular biologist (born 1968)

John Patrick Morrissey (born 31 December 1968 in Cork) is an Irish microbiologist and biotechnologist. Since 2000, he has worked and taught as Professor of Microbiology at University College Cork (UCC), Ireland. Recently he works mainly on the optimisation of yeasts for industrial biotechnology, but is also involved in the works with several other organisms.

== Life and career ==
John Morrissey studied microbiology at University College Cork, graduating with a bachelor's degree in science in 1990. After graduating, he moved to the European Molecular Biology Laboratory (EMBL) in Heidelberg, Germany, where he worked in David Tollervey's group on his doctoral thesis in the field of yeast molecular biology, in particular on specific snoRNA and the formation of rRNA in Saccharomyces cerevisiae. There he worked on translation and stability of mRNA in yeast.

From 1998 to 2000, he worked and researched at the John Innes Centre (JIC) in Norwich, UK, and dealt with drug resistance of fungi to antibiotics produced by plants and with natural fungicides from bacteria. He continued this work after moving to University College Cork in 2000, where he collaborated mainly with the Irish microbiologist Fergal O'Gara to investigate the interactions of root bacteria with their host plants and their fungicidal properties. Since 2003, Morrissey has led his own research group as Professor of Microbiology at the UCC, whose research focus initially continued the previous work. Morrissey also investigated the ecological relationships of bacteria in the root system of plants, the fungicidal effects of root-associated Pseudomonas species and their potential use in environmental biotechnology and general biochemical relationships between bacteria and fungi. From 2010 onwards Morrissey was also working on the biotechnological use and metagenomics of marine organisms, especially of sponges (Porifera), to which he also wrote several book chapters.

His current research focus is on the molecular biology and ecology of yeasts and the use of wild-type genetically modified yeasts for food, beverage or industrial biotechnology. Morrissey is particularly well known for his work on the food and industrial yeast Kluyveromyces marxianus'. Among other projects he leads or has led, are the European research projects YEASTCELL (until 2017), YEASTDOC and CHASSY with a focus on yeasts as production organisms.

== Awards and functions ==
John P. Morrissey is editor in chief of the editorial board of the journal FEMS Yeast Research. Along with Prof Ken Wolfe of University College Dublin, he represents Ireland of the International Commission on Yeasts (ICY). Previously (2013–2017), he served as chair of the Eukaryotic Division of the Microbiology Society and currently he is serving of a member of the Governing Council of the Microbiology Society. He is also a board member of the Microbial Physiology Section of the European Federation of Biotechnology.

== Publications (selection) ==
Heavily cited peer-reviewed articles:

- Yves Henry, Heather Wood, John P. Morrissey, Elisabeth Petfalski, Stephen Kearsey, David Tollervey: The 5′ end of yeast 5.8 S rRNA is generated by exonucleases from an upstream cleavage site. The EMBO Journal 13 (10), 1994; S. 2452–2463. (full text)
- John P. Morrissey, Anne E. Osbourn: Fungal Resistance to Plant Antibiotics as a Mechanism of Pathogenesis. Microbiology and Molecular Biology Reviews 63 (3), September 1999; S. 708–724.
- Ultan F. Walsh, John P. Morrissey, Fergal O'Gara: Pseudomonas for biocontrol of phytopathogens: from functional genomics to commercial exploitation. Current Opinion in Biotechnology 12 (3), 2001; S. 289–295. doi:10.1016/S0958-1669(00)00212-3
- M.M. Lane, J.P. Morrissey: Kluyveromyces marxianus: A yeast emerging from its sister's shadow. Fungal Biology Reviews 24 (1), 2010; S. 17–26. doi:10.1016/j.fbr.2010.01.001
- Jonathan Kennedy, Burkhardt Flemer, Stephen A. Jackson, David P.H. Lejon, John P. Morrissey, Fergal O’Gara, Alan D.W. Dobson: Marine metagenomics: new tools for the study and exploitation of marine microbial metabolism. Marine Drugs 8 (3), 2010; S. 608–628. doi:10.3390/md8030608
- Leonie Baumann, Arun S. Rajkumar, John P. Morrissey, Eckhard Boles, Mislav Oreb: A Yeast-Based Biosensor for Screening of Short- and Medium-Chain Fatty Acid Production. ACS Synthetic Biology 7 (11), 2018; pp 2640–2646. doi:10.1021/acssynbio.8b00309.
