= Jan of Holešov =

Jan z Holešova or Jan of Holešov (1366 in Holešov – 1436 in Rajhrad) was a Czech writer, linguist, musicologist, theologian, and one of the first ethnographers and a founder of modern comparative linguistics.

== Biography ==
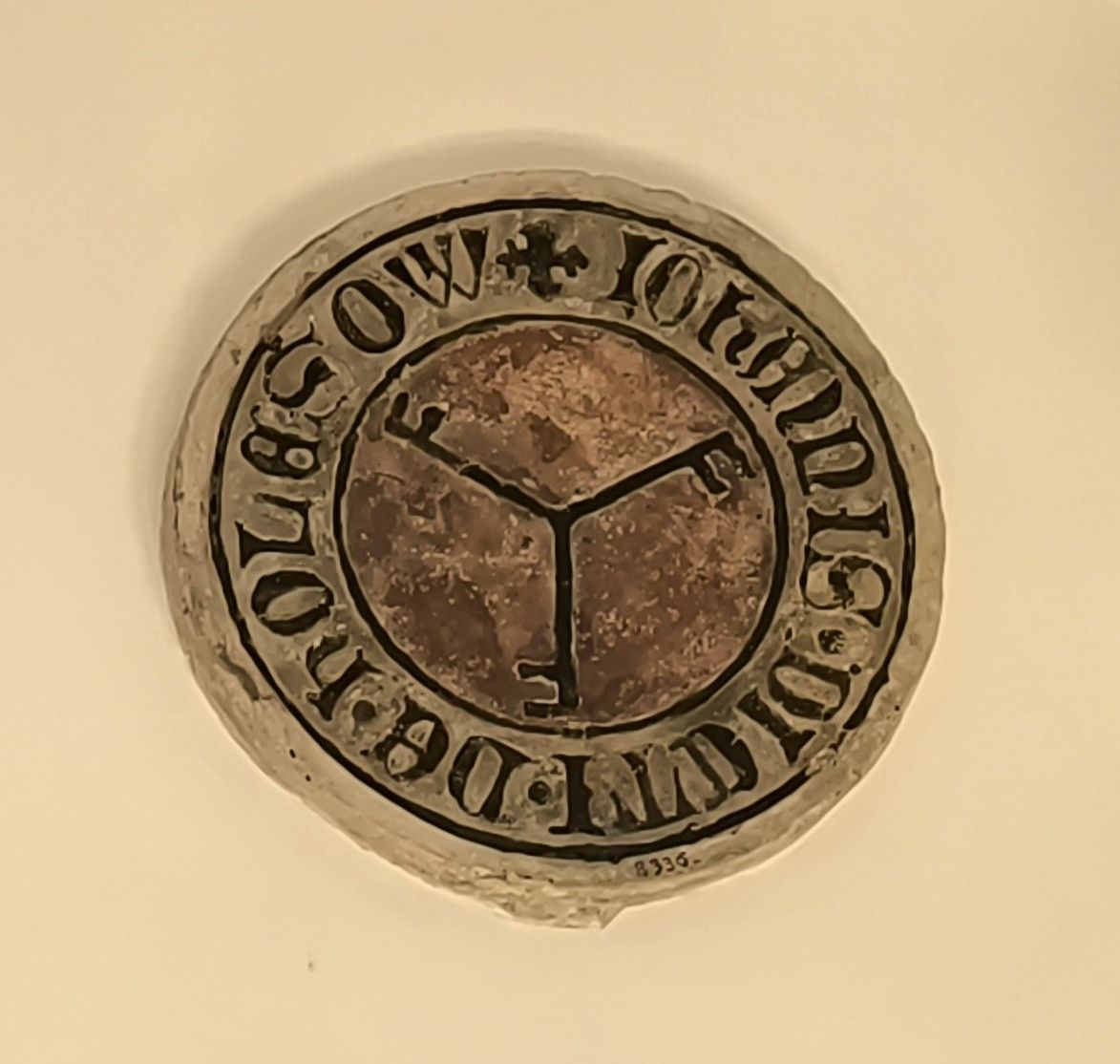
Coat of arms of Jan of Holešov

Jan of Holešov was born as the son of the administrator of the bishop's property in Holešov (Moravia). After a brief (and historically uncertain) period spent acting as a priest in Slušovice, he went to study to the Sorbonne, and after his return he joined the Benedictine monastery in Břevnov in Prague. After the outbreak of the Hussite Wars, when the monastery was destroyed, he moved to the Benedictine monastery in Rajhrad u Brna (1420), where he served as prior and died in 1436.

== Work ==
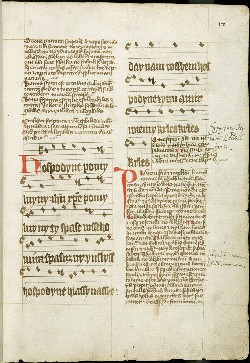
The record of the song "Hospodine, pomiluj ny" ("Lord, Have Mercy on Us") in the chronicle of Jan from Holešov from 1397

His entire career was as a monk and scholar, and he probably was one of the most educated persons of his time. He became widely renowned for two publications for which his authorship is confirmed. The first, written in 1397, is a theological, but above all linguistic, analysis of the oldest-known Czech song "Lord, Have Mercy on Us" from the 10th or the first half of the 11th century (whose authorship is sometimes ascribed to Saint Adalbert of Prague). Despite some small factual errors and limited access to the sources, it is the first work of modern comparative linguistics, for which Jan of Holešov could be considered a founder.

Even more important is his "Treatise on Christmas Eve", where he describes and analyzes the folk customs associated with the celebration of Christmas Day and evening. This is an early example of an ethnography. He analyzes the different Christmas customs (using his own childhood experience), including their probable roots and describes the oldest known Slavic carol "Vele, vele, stojí dubec vprostřed dvoru" ("Vele, Vele, the Oak Stands in the Middle of the Court").

The Czech historian Josef Pekař attributed the authorship of Czech spelling with diacritical marks (instead of the previously used digraphs) to Jan; however, other historians have attributed that contribution to Jan Hus, possibly from ideological reasons, when the Hussite movement became a kind of national ideology in Czech lands. Jan of Holešov was considered a theological opponent of Jan Hus, and in the 19th century a letter criticizing Jan Hus, called "Utrum credit possit in Papam", surfaced, supposedly sent by Jan from Holešov to the Pope. Modern linguistics cast doubt on the authorship of the letter, because Jan of Holešov used a different style of writing, but, because of that allegation, he and his works were ignored for a long time and remain widely unknown until now.

Besides the two works mentioned above, Jan of Holešov may be the author of five other books, but his authorship of these is not certain.
