= Baker's yeast =

Yeast used as a leavening agent in baking

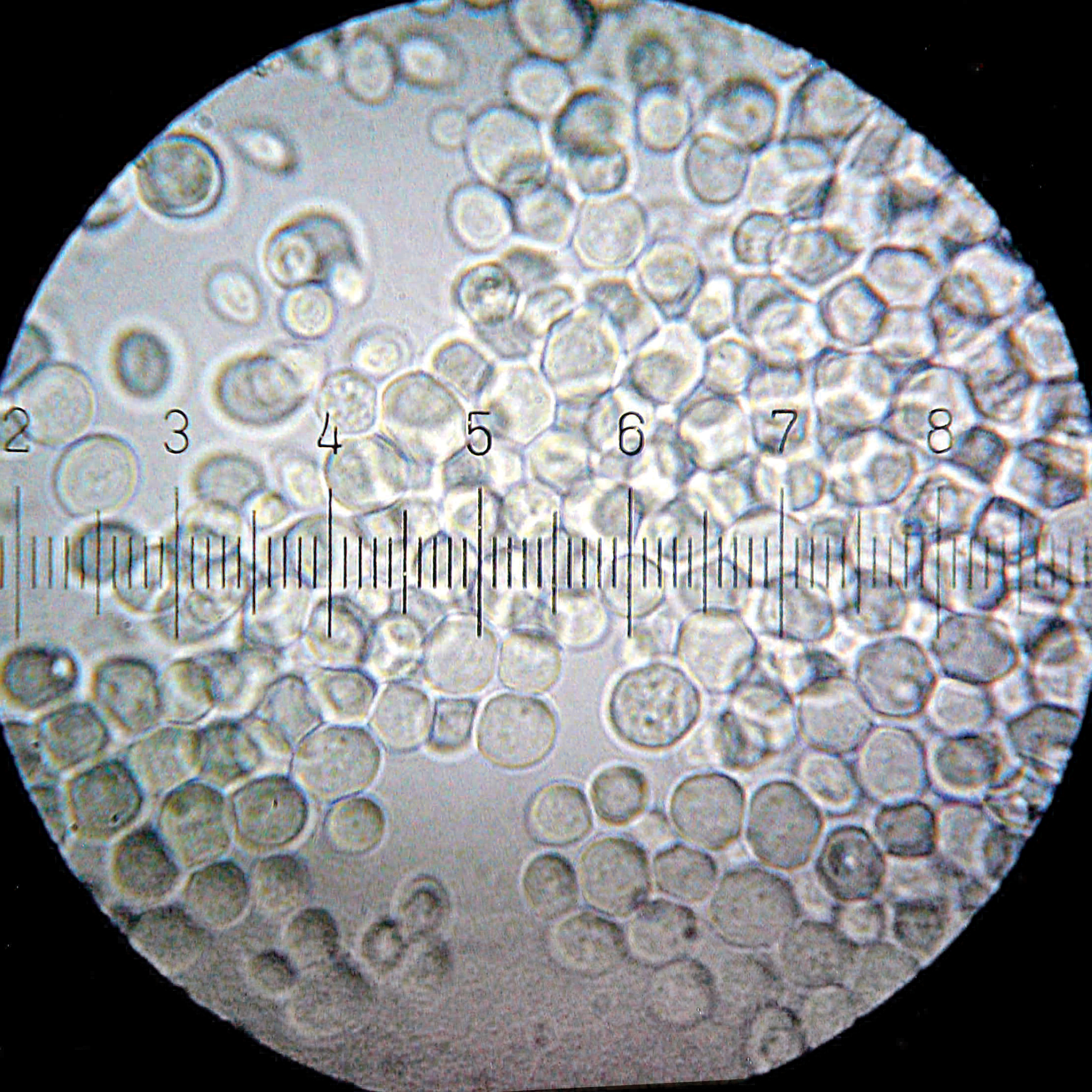
Saccharomyces cerevisiae, the yeast commonly used as baker's yeast. Gradation marks are 1 μm apart.

Baker's yeast is the common name for the strains of yeast commonly used in baking bread and other bakery products, serving as a leavening agent which causes the bread to rise (expand and become lighter and softer) by converting the fermentable sugars present in the dough into carbon dioxide and ethanol. Baker's yeast is of the species Saccharomyces cerevisiae, and is the same species (but a different strain) as the kind commonly used in alcoholic fermentation, which is called brewer's yeast or the deactivated form nutritional yeast. Baker's yeast is also a single-cell microorganism found on and around the human body.

The use of steamed or boiled potatoes, water from potato boiling, or sugar in a bread dough provides food for the growth of yeasts; however, too much sugar will dehydrate them. Yeast growth is inhibited by both salt and sugar, but more so by salt than sugar. Some sources say fats, such as butter and eggs, slow yeast growth; others say the effect of fat on dough remains unclear, presenting evidence that small amounts of fat are beneficial for baked bread volume.

Kazachstania exigua (formerly known as Saccharomyces exiguus), is a wild yeast found on plants, grains, and fruits that is occasionally used for baking; however, in general, it is not used in a pure form but comes from being propagated in a sourdough starter.

== History ==
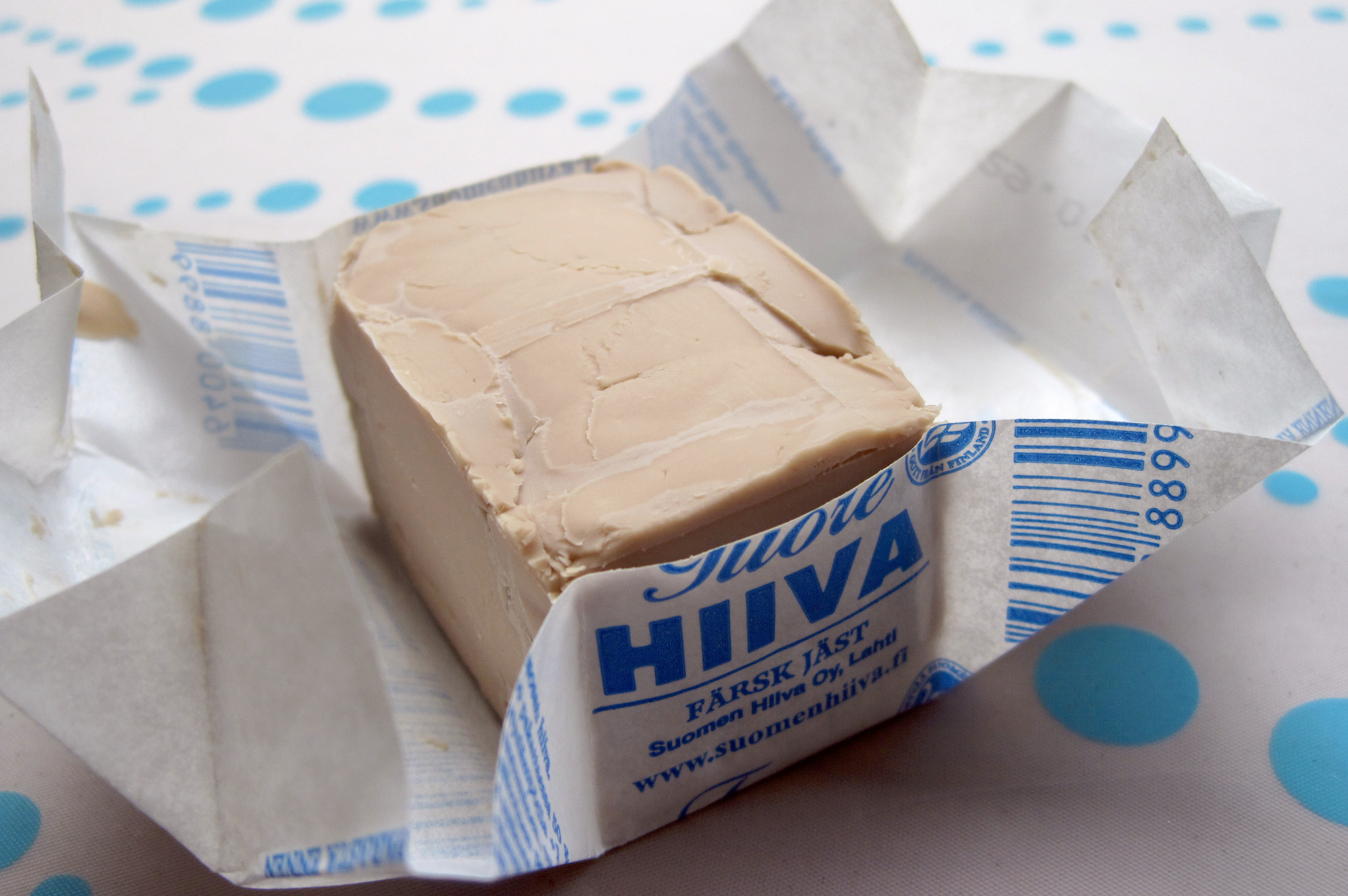
A block of compressed fresh yeast in its wrapper

It is not known when yeast was first used to bake bread; the earliest definite records come from Ancient Egypt. Researchers speculate that a mixture of flour meal and water was left longer than usual on a warm day and the yeasts that occur in natural contaminants of the flour caused it to ferment before baking. The resulting bread would have been lighter and tastier than the previous hard flatbreads. It is generally assumed that the earliest forms of leavening were likely very similar to modern sourdough; the leavening action of yeast would have been discovered from its action on flatbread doughs and would have been either cultivated separately or transferred from batch to batch by means of previously mixed ("old") dough. Also, the development of leavened bread seems to have developed in close proximity to the development of beer brewing, and barm from the beer fermentation process can also be used in bread making.

Without an understanding of microbiology, early bakers would have had little ability to directly control yeast cultures but still kept locally interesting cultures by reusing doughs and starters to leaven later batches. However, it became possible to isolate and propagate favored yeast strains in the same manner as was done in the beer industry, and it eventually became practical to propagate yeast in a slurry with a composition similar to beer wort, usually including malted barley and wheat flour. Such cultures (sometimes referred to in old American cookery as "emptins", from their origins as the dregs of beer or cider fermentation) became the ancestors of modern baker's yeast, as, in general, they were carefully maintained to avoid what was later discovered to be bacterial contamination, including using preservatives, such as hops, as well as boiling the growth medium.

In the 19th century, bread bakers obtained their yeast from beer brewers, and this led to sweet-fermented breads such as the Imperial "Kaiser-Semmel" roll, which in general lacked the sourness created by the acidification typical of Lactobacillus. However, beer brewers slowly switched from top-fermenting to bottom-fermenting yeast (Saccharomyces pastorianus) and this created a shortage of yeast for making bread, so the Vienna Process was developed in 1846. While the innovation is often popularly credited for using steam in baking ovens, leading to a different crust characteristic, it is notable for including procedures for high milling of grains (see Vienna grits), cracking them incrementally instead of mashing them with one pass; as well as better processes for growing and harvesting top-fermenting yeasts, known as press-yeast.

Refinements in microbiology following the work of Louis Pasteur led to more advanced methods of culturing pure strains. In 1879, Great Britain introduced specialized growing vats for the production of S. cerevisiae, and in the United States around the turn of the century centrifuges were used for concentrating the yeast, making modern commercial yeast possible, and turning yeast production into a major industrial endeavor. The slurry yeast made by small bakers and grocery shops became cream yeast, a suspension of live yeast cells in growth medium, and then compressed yeast, the fresh cake yeast that became the standard leaven for bread bakers in much of the Westernized world during the early 20th century.

During World War II, Fleischmann's developed a granulated active dry yeast for the United States armed forces, which did not require refrigeration and had a longer shelf-life and better temperature tolerance than fresh yeast; it is still the standard yeast for US military recipes. The company created yeast that would rise twice as fast, cutting down on baking time.

In 1973, Lesaffre created instant yeast (also called "quick rise" or "fast acting" yeast), which has gained considerable use and market share at the expense of both fresh and active dry yeast in their various applications. Instant yeast differs from active dry yeast in several ways: Instant yeast rises faster than active dry yeast; instant yeast can be directly added to the dry ingredients, whereas active dry yeast should be mixed with liquid (water, milk or beer) and proofed before mixing; instant yeast has a lower moisture content; and instant yeast is formed of smaller granules.

Modern baker's yeast is the species Saccharomyces cerevisiae. One of its properties is that it is not inhibited by propionates, which are commonly added to baked goods like bread dough to inhibit mold development and bacterial growth. Conversely, sorbates do inhibit yeast fermentation activity, so are not added directly to yeast-leavened dough but may be sprayed onto finished products or even incorporated into packing materials.

== Types of baker's yeast ==
Yeast, baker's, active dry
Nutritional value per 100 g (3.5 oz)
- Energy: 1,361 kJ (325 kcal)
- Carbohydrates: 41.22 g
- Sugars: 0 g
- Dietary fiber: 26.9 g
- Fat: 7.61 g
- Protein: 40.44 g
Vitamins and minerals
Vitamins	Quantity %DV^{†}
Thiamine (B1)	916% 10.99 mg
Riboflavin (B2)	308% 4 mg
Niacin (B3)	251% 40.2 mg
Pantothenic acid (B5)	270% 13.5 mg
Vitamin B6	88% 1.5 mg
Folate (B9)	585% 2340 μg
Choline	6% 32 mg
Vitamin C	0% 0.3 mg
Minerals	Quantity %DV^{†}
Calcium	2% 30 mg
Iron	12% 2.17 mg
Magnesium	13% 54 mg
Manganese	14% 0.312 mg
Phosphorus	51% 637 mg
Potassium	32% 955 mg
Sodium	2% 51 mg
Zinc	72% 7.94 mg
- Other constituents: Quantity
- Water: 5.08 g
- Link to USDA Database entry
- ^{†}Percentages estimated using US recommendations for adults, except for potassium, which is estimated based on expert recommendation from the National Academies.

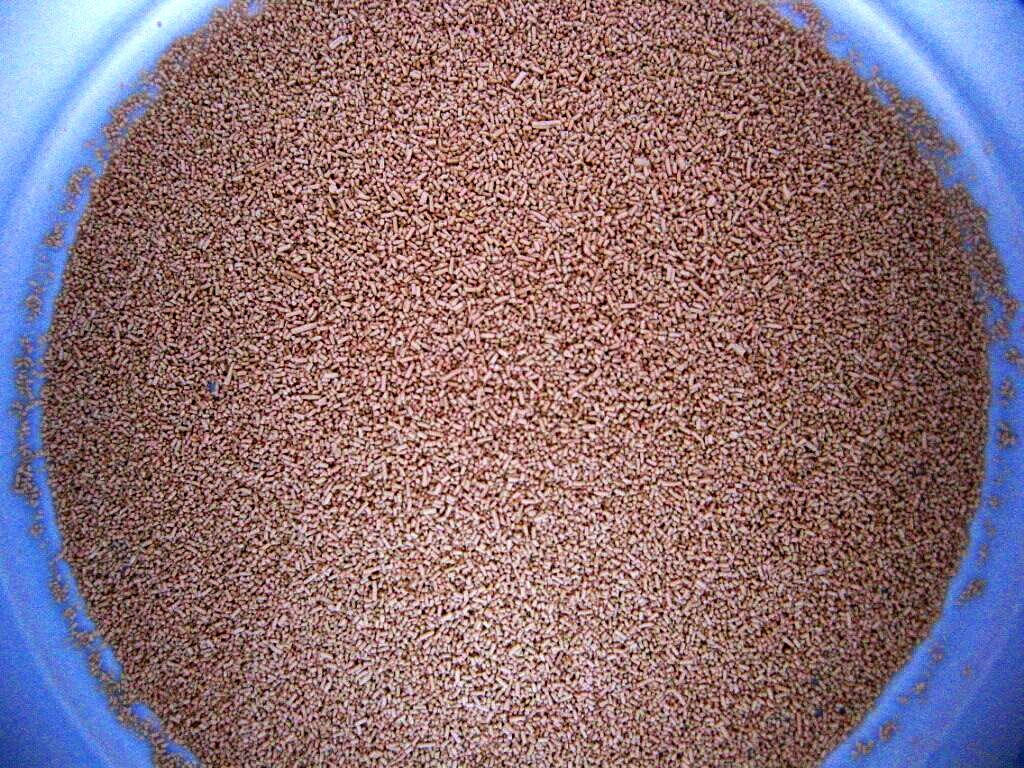
Active dried yeast, a granulated form in which yeast is commercially sold

Baker's yeast is available in a number of different forms, the main differences being the moisture contents. Though each version has certain advantages over the others, the choice of which form to use is largely a question of the requirements of the recipe at hand and the training of the cook preparing it. Dry yeast forms are good choices for longer-term storage, often lasting more than a year at room temperatures without significant loss of viability. In general, with occasional allowances for liquid content and temperature, the different forms of commercial yeast are considered interchangeable.

- Cream yeast is the closest form to the yeast slurries of the 19th century, in essence being a suspension of yeast cells in liquid, siphoned off from the growth medium. Its primary use is in industrial bakeries with special high-volume dispensing and mixing equipment, and it is not readily available to small bakeries or home cooks.
- Compressed yeast is, in essence, cream yeast with most of the liquid removed. It is a soft solid, beige in color, and best known in the consumer form as small, foil-wrapped cubes of cake yeast. It is also available in a larger-block form for bulk usage. It is highly perishable; though formerly widely available for the consumer market, it has become less common in supermarkets in some countries due to its poor keeping properties, having been superseded in some such markets by active dry and instant yeast. It is still widely available for commercial use, and is somewhat more tolerant of low temperatures than other forms of commercial yeast; however, even there, instant yeast has made significant market inroads.
- Active dry yeast is the form of yeast most commonly available to non-commercial bakers in the United States. It consists of coarse oblong granules of yeast, with live yeast cells encapsulated in a thick jacket of dry, dead cells with some growth medium. Under most conditions, active dry yeast must first be proofed or rehydrated. It can be stored at room temperature for a year, or frozen for more than a decade, which means that it has better keeping qualities than other forms, but it is generally considered more sensitive than other forms to thermal shock when actually used in recipes.

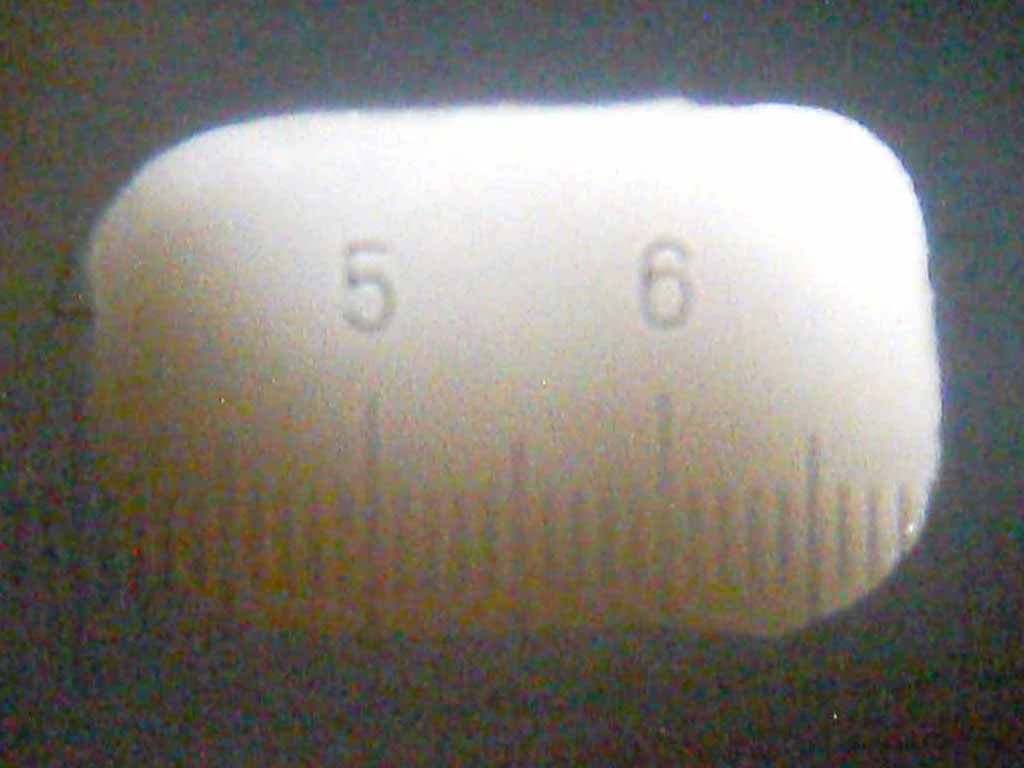
A single grain of active dry yeast. The numbered ticks on the scale are 230 μm apart.

- Instant yeast appears similar to active dry yeast, but has smaller granules with substantially higher percentages of live cells per comparable unit volumes. It is more perishable than active dry yeast but also does not require rehydration, and can usually be added directly to all but the driest doughs. In general, instant yeast has a small amount of ascorbic acid added as a preservative. Some producers provide specific variants for doughs with high sugar contents, and such yeasts are more generally known as osmotolerant yeasts.
- Rapid-rise yeast is a variety/type of dried yeast (usually a form of instant yeast) that is of a smaller granular size, thus it dissolves faster in dough, and it provides greater carbon dioxide output to allow faster rising. There is considerable debate as to the value of such a product; while most baking experts believe it reduces the flavor potential of the finished product, Cook's Illustrated magazine, among others, feels that, at least for direct-rise recipes, it makes little difference. Rapid-rise yeast is often marketed specifically for use in bread machines.
- Deactivated yeast is dead yeast which has no leavening value and is not interchangeable with other yeast types. Typically used for pizza and pan bread doughs, it is used at a rate of 0.1% of the flour weight, though manufacturer specifications may vary. It is a powerful reducing agent used to increase the extensibility of a dough.

=== Difference between instant and active dry yeast ===
Instant and active dry yeast are essentially the same ingredient, just in slightly different forms and applications. Consumers should keep sealed packets of both yeast types at room temperature and store partially used packets in an airtight container in the refrigerator. The main differences between the two are:

- Active yeast needs rehydration. Instant yeast can be mixed directly into dry ingredients, whereas active dry yeast must first be dissolved and rehydrated in warm water.
- Instant yeast needs less time to rise. Since instant yeast has a finer texture than active dry yeast, it is possible to skip the initial rise time and shape loaves immediately after kneading. Loaves made with active dry yeast require longer rising times for the yeast to work its way through the dough.

== Commercial brands ==
For most commercial uses, yeast of any form is packaged in bulk (blocks or freezer bags for fresh yeast; vacuum-packed brick bags for dry or instant); however, yeast for home use is often packaged in pre-measured doses, either small squares for compressed yeast or sealed packets for dry or instant. For active dry and instant yeast, in general a single dose (reckoned for the average bread recipe of between 500g and 1000g of dough) is about 2.5 tsp (~12 mL) or about 7 g (1/4 oz), though comparatively lesser amounts are used when the yeast is used in a pre-ferment. In general, a yeast flavor in the baked bread is not noticeable when the bakers' percent of added yeast is less than 2.5%.

Notable commercial brands of baker's yeast include Lesaffre's SAF red and SAF gold, Fleischmann's, and Red Star Yeast.

== Use in research ==
=== Model organism ===
Because it is readily available and easy to culture, baker's yeast has long been used in chemical, biological, and genetic research as a model organism. Saccharomyces cerevisiae is a facultative anaerobe and undergoes aerobic fermentation in the presences of oxygen and sugars. In 1996, after six years of work, S. cerevisiae became the first eukaryote to have its entire genome sequenced. It has over 12 million base pairs and around 6000 genes. Since then, it has remained in the forefront of genetic research. For example, most of our knowledge of the cell division cycle was worked out from experiments with yeast.

=== Organic synthesis ===
Reduction of a carbonyl to a hydroxyl with baker's yeast

Baker's yeast contains enzymes that can reduce a carbonyl group into a hydroxyl group in fairly high yield, thus making it useful for biotransformations in organic syntheses. It is known to reduce organometallic carbonyl compounds in very high yield.

==== Psychoactive drugs ====
- Baker's yeast can also be used to produce ethanol via fermentation for use in chemical synthesis, although doing so in some places requires permits.
- A GMO strain of baker's yeast, DLAM33B, has been developed to produce the precursor for LSD, lysergic acid.

== Industrial production ==
The baking industry relies on industrial production of its ingredients, including baking yeasts. Much effort has been put into developing and marketing yeasts that will perform reliably in mass production. Since the end of the nineteenth century, baker's yeast has been produced by companies that specialize in its production.

The main ingredients for industrial production are yeast cultures, sugar from cane and sugar beet; but a number of minerals, nitrogen and vitamins are also needed.

Fermentation happens in several phases, which vary depending on the manufacturer:

- pure cultures in a laboratory flask for 2 to 4 days, then batch fermentations for 13 to 24 hours (anaerobic);
- intermediate and stock fermentation with gradual feeding and constant aeration;
- pitch and trade fermentation with large air supplies for up to 15 hours;
- filtration, blending, extrusion, and cutting, drying.

The yeast grows from hundreds of kilograms in the intermediate and stock fermentor to tens of thousands of kilograms in the trade fermentor, where most yeast is produced. The earlier stages produce more ethanol and other alcohols, while in the final stages ethanol production is suppressed up to 95% by controlling the amount of oxygen and sugar, in order to increase the yeast production instead.

The industry is highly concentrated, with five companies holding up to 80% of the worldwide market for dry yeast as of 2006. While dry yeast is exported over long distances and mostly sold in the developing countries, industrial customers often prefer to supply fresh yeast from local facilities, with a single wholesaler having up to 90% of the liquid yeast market in the UK in 2006. In the US companies like Lesaffre Group, AB Vista, GB Plange and AB Mauri produced hundreds of thousands of metric tons of yeast in 2012.

== See also ==
- Dough
- Bread
- Wine
