= Manny Randazzo King Cakes =

Bakery in New Orleans, Louisiana

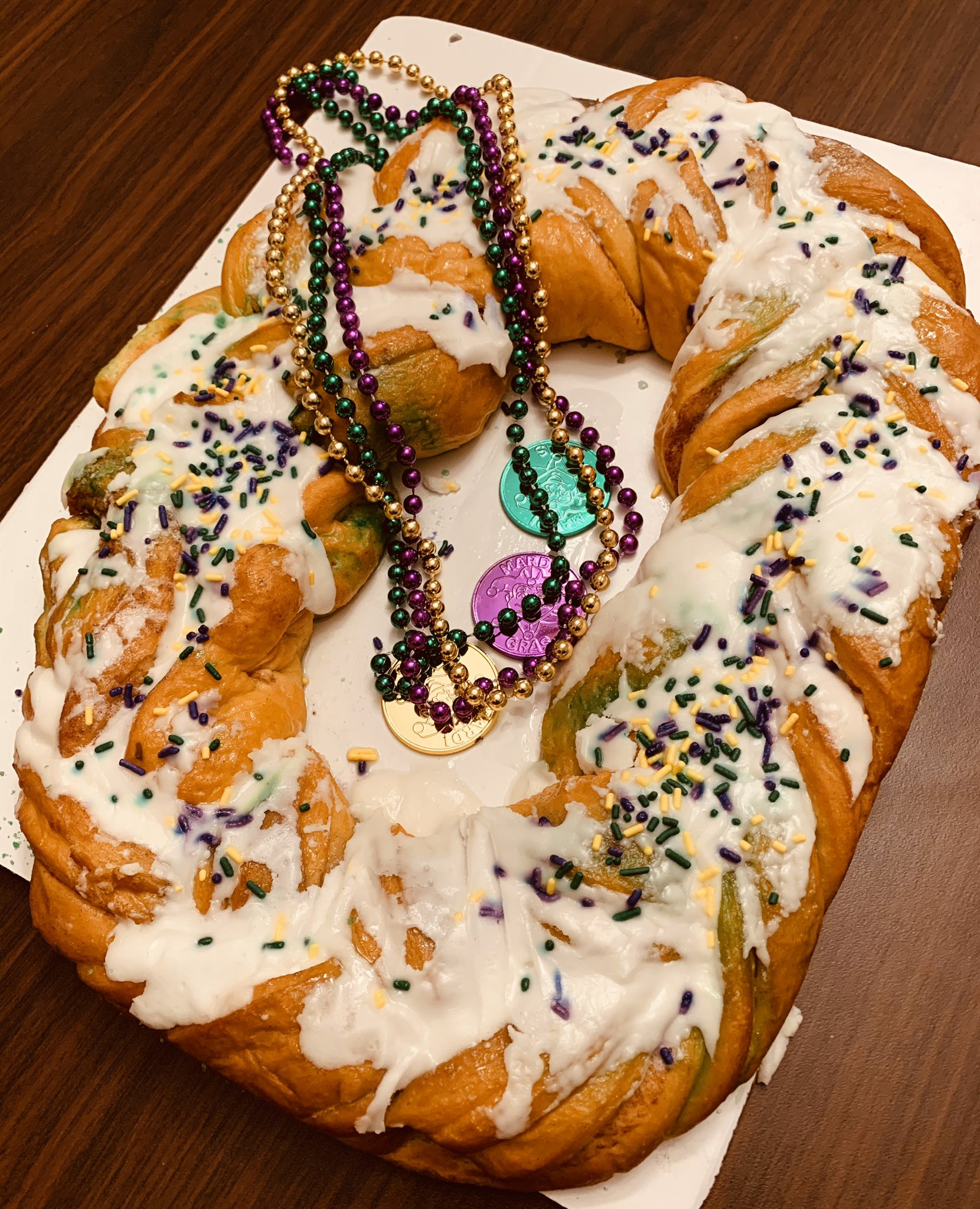
- A Manny Randazzo King Cake
- Industry: Bakery
- Founded: 1965; 61 years ago
- Founders: Sam Randazzo; Lawrence Randazzo; Manuel Randazzo; Anthony Randazzo
- Headquarters: Metairie, Louisiana, United States

Manny Randazzo King Cakes is a bakery in Metairie, Louisiana in the United States. The bakery was founded in 1965 by Sam Randazzo and his three sons: Lawrence, Manuel and Anthony. The bakery specializes in king cakes.

Randazzo King Cakes won best traditional king cake in the annual King Cake Snob competition, in 2017 and 2019. Their king cake has been named one of the best in New Orleans by The Times-Picayune/The New Orleans Advocate food critic Ian McNulty and one of the best in the country by Food & Wine. Randazzo King Cakes have been featured on Delish and Eater, on Fox 8 New Orleans, and in Southern Living.

Every year, US Congressman Steve Scalise buys and delivers Randazzo King Cakes to fellow congresspeople during Mardi Gras.
