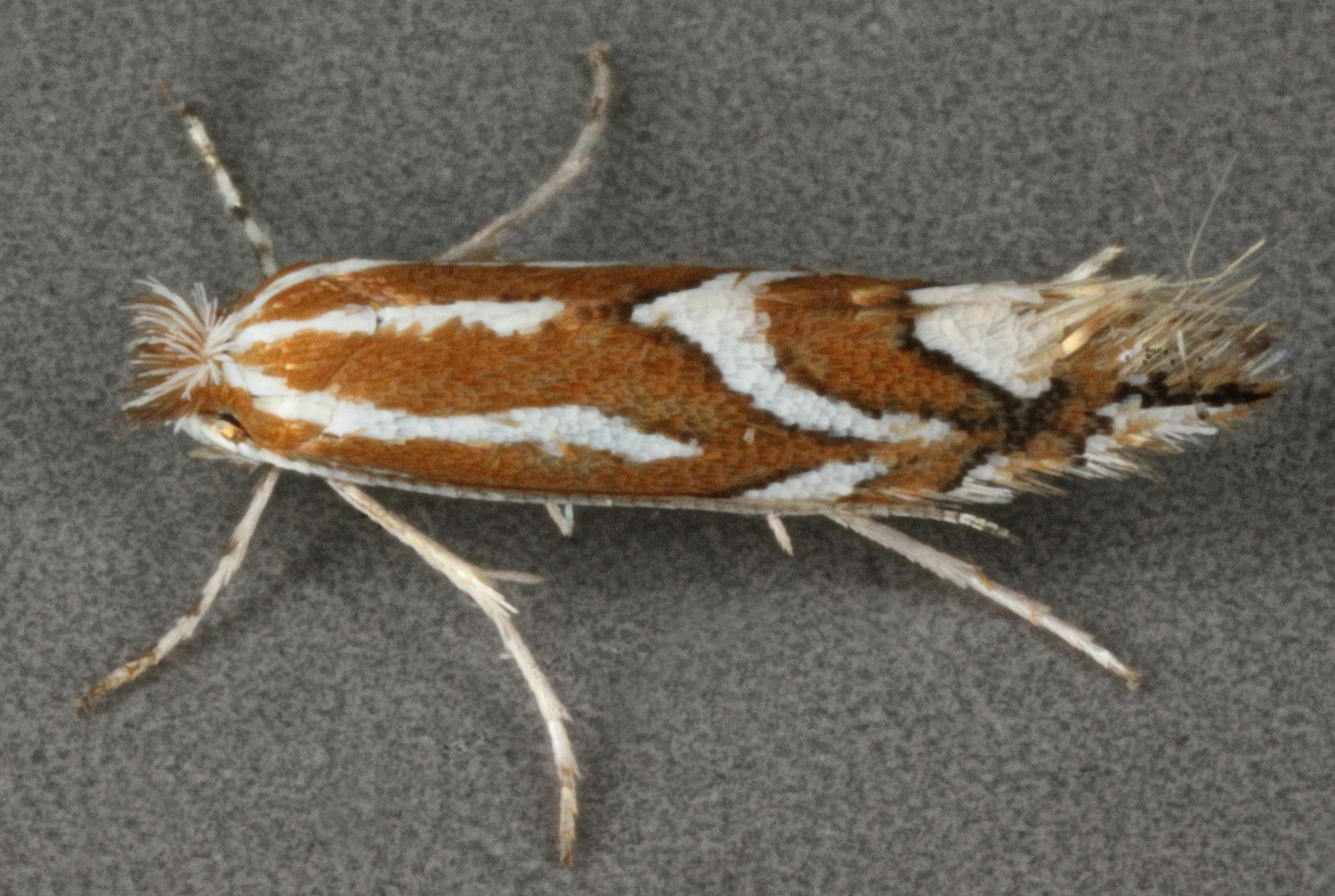

Scientific classification
- Kingdom: Animalia
- Phylum: Arthropoda
- Class: Insecta
- Order: Lepidoptera
- Family: Gracillariidae
- Genus: Phyllonorycter
- Species: P. cerasicolella

Binomial name
- Phyllonorycter cerasicolella (Herrich-Schaffer, 1855)

Synonyms
- Lithocolletis cerasicolella Herrich-Schaffer, 1855

= Phyllonorycter cerasicolella =

Species of moth

Phyllonorycter cerasicolella is a moth of the family Gracillariidae. It is known from all of Europe, except northern Scandinavia.

The wingspan is 7–8 mm. The posterior tarsi are whitish. Forewings are golden-orange; a white median streak from base to near middle; dorsum narrowly white towards base; four costal and three dorsal shining white anteriorly blackish-margined wedge-shaped spots; a black apical strigula, edged above with white. Hindwings are grey. The larva is pale yellow; head dark brown or black; plate of segment 2 orange-yellow.

It is very similar to Phyllonorycter spinicolella and study of the genitalia is essential for determination.

There are two to three generations per year in western Europe.

The larvae feed on Prunus cerasifera, Prunus mahaleb and sometimes Prunus spinosa, as well as various cultivated Prunus species. Mines may also occur on Malus species when grown in proximity of cultivated Prunus. They mine the leaves of their host plant.
