= Açma =

Turkish pastry, often eaten as street food

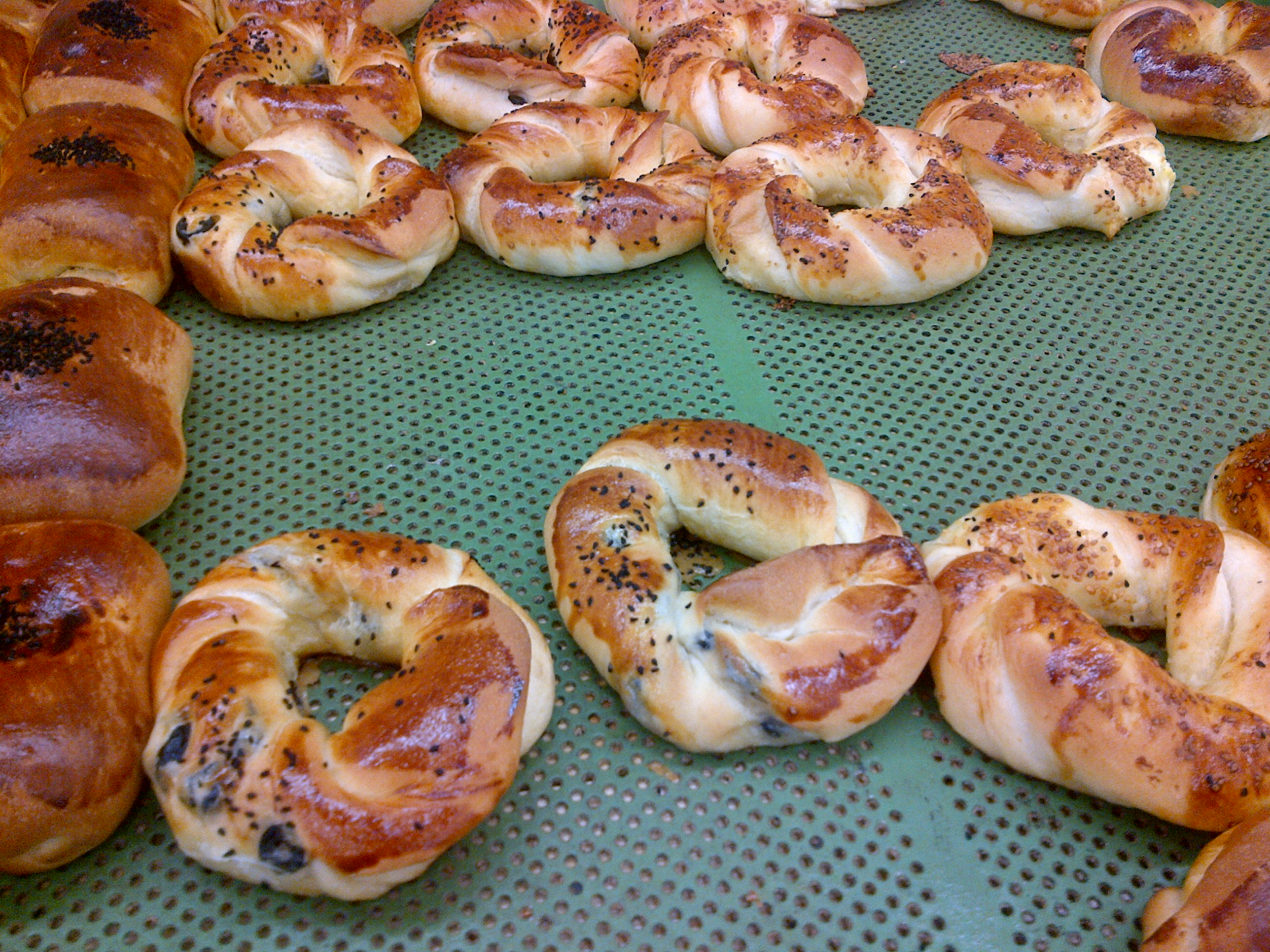
Açma

Açma is a slightly sweet yeast pastry from Turkish cuisine that is often offered as street food. Common varieties are bread rolls, dough rings, and dough rolls, often with additional savory or sweet fillings.

== Characteristics ==
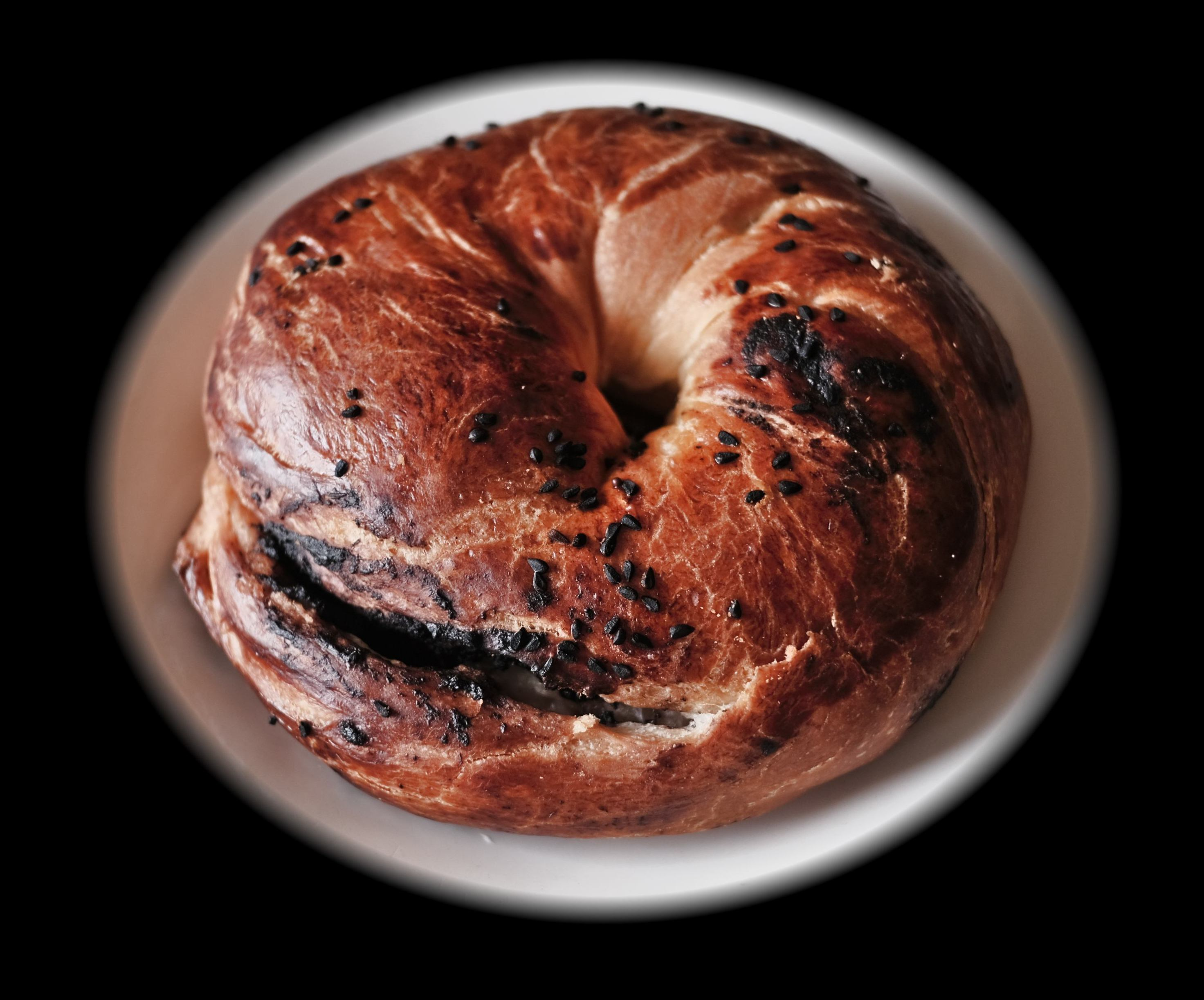
Açma variant filled with olive paste

Açma is a yeast dough pastry, similar to a plaited bread, brioche or Çörek. There are many variations of Açma. The dough typically consists of wheat flour, butter, milk, baking yeast, sugar and salt. The dough is formed into rings, rolls or balls and left to rise again on the baking tray. It is then coated with egg yolk, possibly sprinkled with black cumin or sesame seeds and baked in the oven.

Unlike the Poğaça, an Açma contains butter and usually no egg in the dough. Unlike the Simit, which is rolled in sesame seeds, an Açma is more like a milk bun.

An açma is only slightly sweet. As a result, it is sometimes eaten with salty side dishes such as cheese or olives.

== Origin and designation ==
Açma is popular and widespread throughout Turkey. The place and time of its origin are unknown. No city or region claims to be its place of origin. The word açma probably comes from the Turkish verb açmak 'to open'.
