= Mahleb =

Spice made from cherry pits

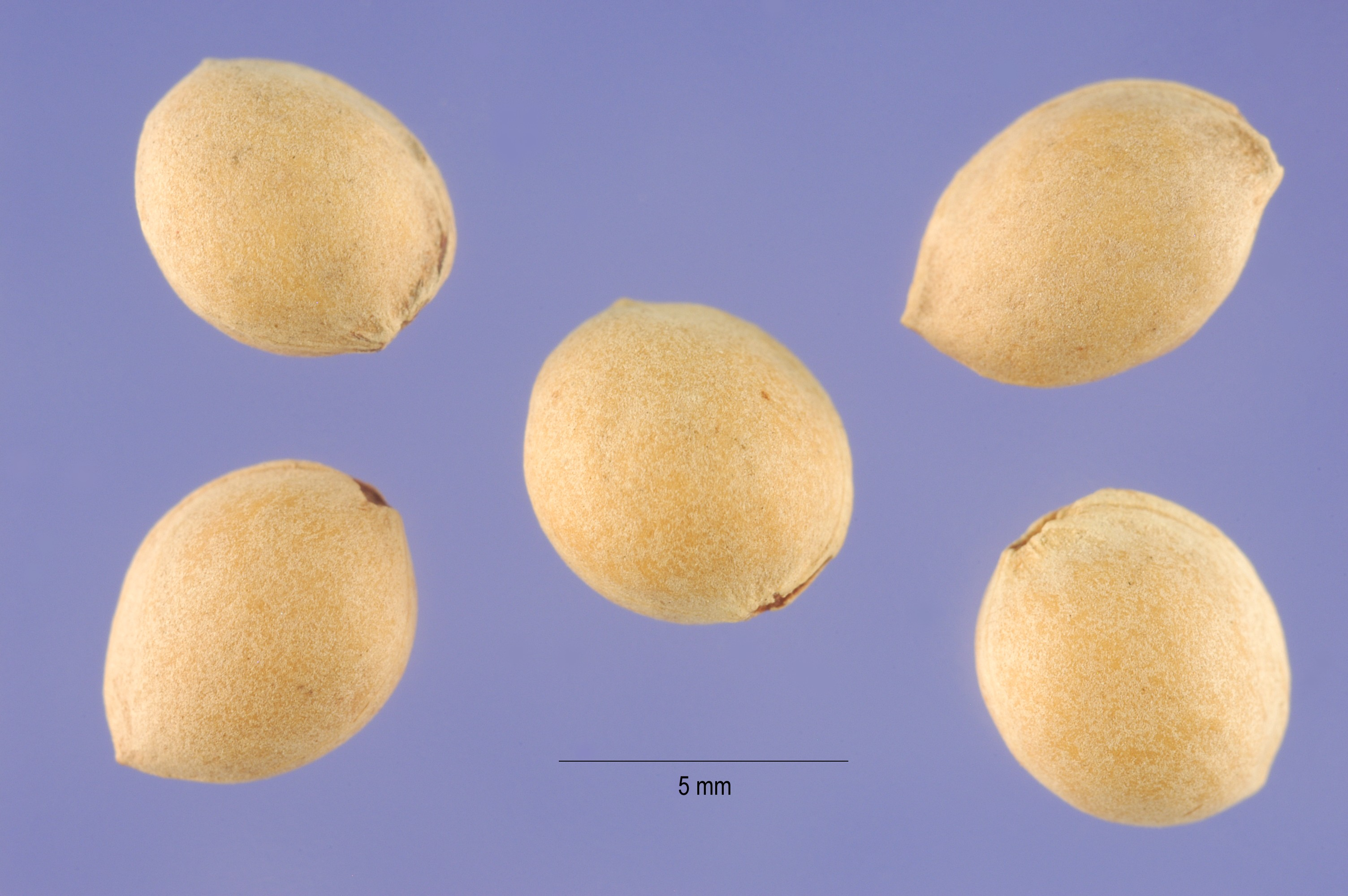
- Whole stones; the seeds are inside
- Alternative names: Mahlepi
- Type: Spice
- Region or state: Middle East
- Main ingredients: Cherry seeds

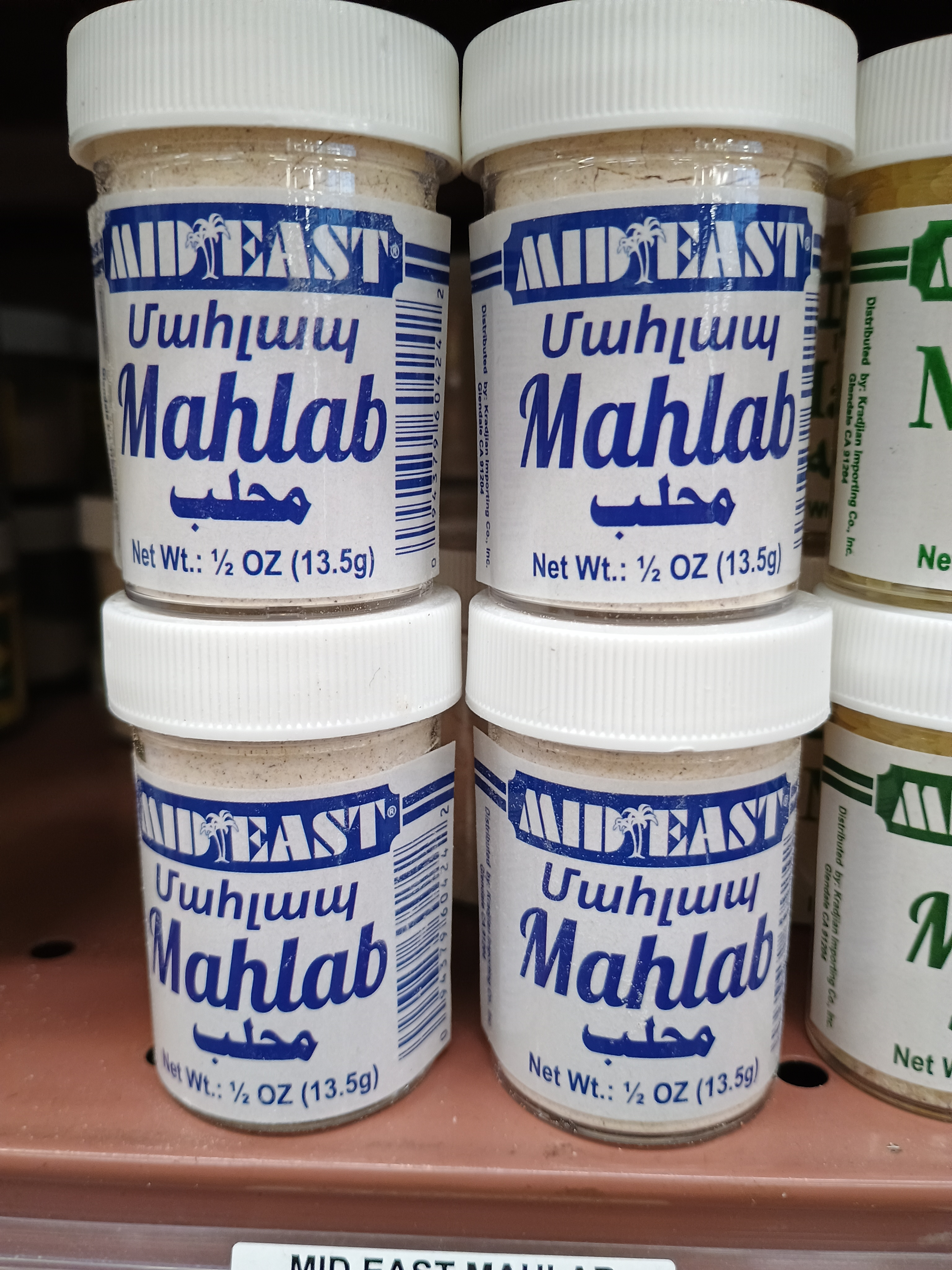
Packaged mahleb with English, Armenian and Arabic text

Mahleb or mahlepi is an aromatic spice made from the seeds of a species of cherry, Prunus mahaleb (the Mahaleb or St Lucie cherry). The cherry stones are cracked to extract the seed kernel, which is about 5 mm in diameter, and soft and chewy on extraction. The seed kernel is ground to a powder before use. Its flavour is similar to a combination of bitter almond and cherry, and also similar to marzipan.

Mahleb is used in small quantities to flavor sweet foods and cakes, and is used in the production of tresse cheese.

It has been used for centuries in the Middle East and the surrounding areas as a flavoring for baked goods. Recipes calling for the fruit or seed of the "ḫalub" date back to ancient Sumer. In recent decades, it has been slowly entering mainstream cookbooks in English.

In Greek cuisine, mahlep is sometimes added to holiday breads and cakes such as Christopsomo (gr: χριστόψωμο) for Christmas, vasilopita for New Year's Day, and the braided tsoureki for Easter (called cheoreg in Armenian and paskalya çöreği in Turkish).

In Turkey, it is used in poğaça scones and other pastries. In the Arabic Middle East, it is used in ma'amoul scones. In Egypt, powdered mahlab is made into a paste with honey, sesame seeds and nuts, eaten as a dessert or a snack with bread.

In English, mahleb is sometimes alternatively spelled as mahalab, mahlep, mahaleb, and other variations.

== See also ==
- List of cherry dishes
