= Fève =

Trinket hidden in a king cake

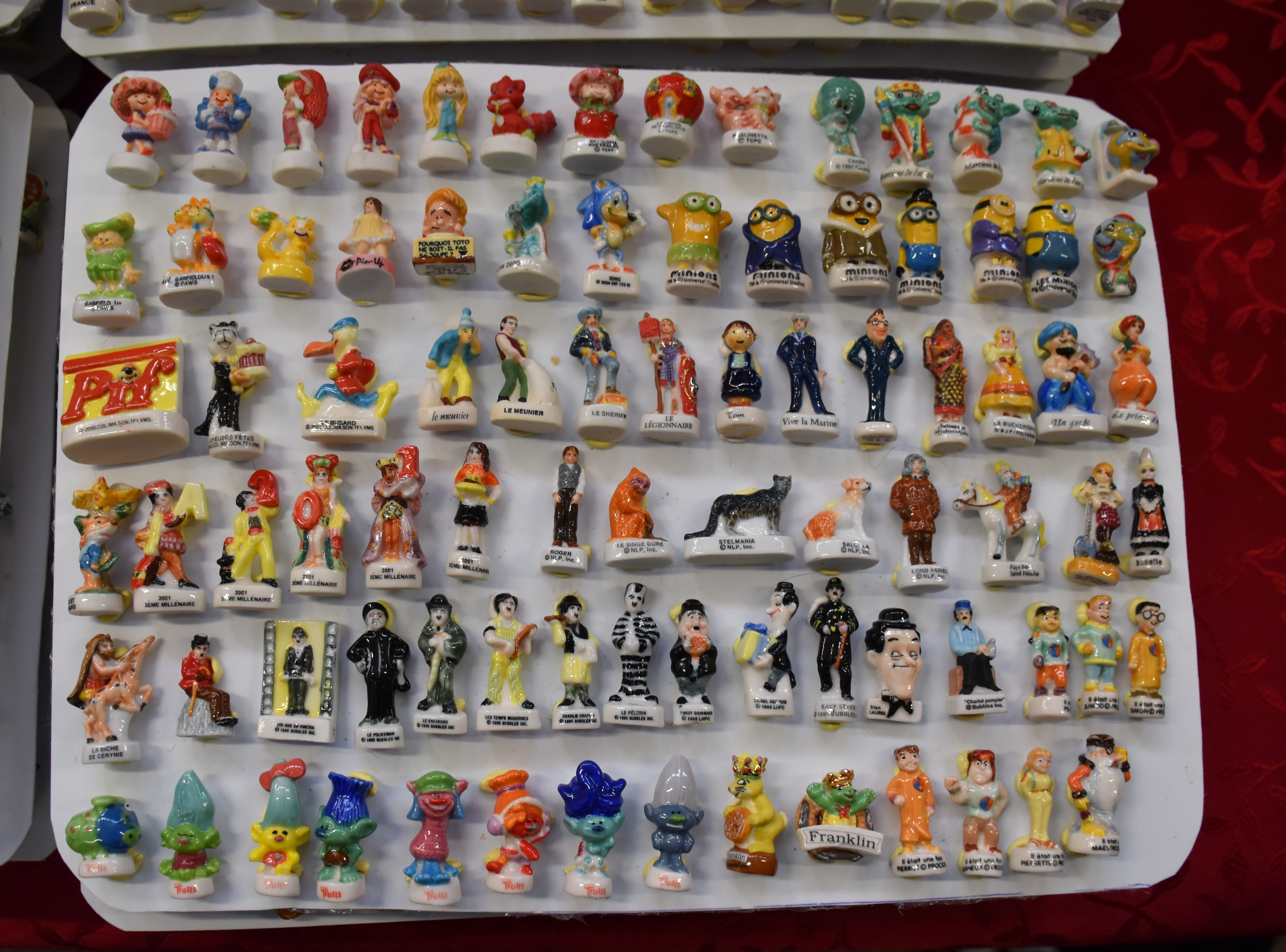
A large selection of fèves

A fève is a small trinket hidden in a king cake or similar dessert. They may also be known as trinkets or favors. The French word fève translates to 'fava bean', which is what was originally hidden in the cake. Modern fèves can be made out of other materials, such as porcelain or plastic, and can take varied shapes and forms. The themes of fève are very diverse and may include religious symbols, tools related to baking or even depictions of famous figures. Cakes with fèves are found throughout Europe and the US and are particularly associated with Three Kings Day or Mardi Gras. The person who finds the fève usually is awarded special privileges or gifts for the day. Fèves have also become collector's items, and in France, their collectors are known as fabophiles or favophiles.

== History in Europe ==
During the Middle Ages bakers began replacing the fava bean with a porcelain trinket, usually depicting religious figures like the baby Jesus. By the 19th century these icons had largely replaced the fava bean and included whimsical shapes like lucky charms as well as more risqué subject matter. By the 20th century cartoon characters and pop culture icons were also integrated into designs and were more commonly made of plastic post-1950.

During the Nazi occupation of France, 13 fèves were commissioned for a group of Nazi officers. Each one was emblazoned with a swastika and possession of one allegedly allowed the officer entry into an exclusive swingers club. Modern fabophiles have indicated that some of these figures have survived into the modern era. However, these collectors generally do not care to acknowledge them due to their connection to genocide and military occupation, as well as fear of theft held by those in possession of one or more of the items.

In contemporary times, fèves are released in sets of eight to twelve, generally inexpensive, and designed to appeal to children and collectors alike.

== In the United States ==
In an American king cake—popularly eaten during Epiphanytide, as well as around Mardi Gras in New Orleans and the Gulf Coast—the fève traditionally takes the form of a small plastic or porcelain baby, symbolizing baby Jesus. Fava beans were also used to represent Jesus.

The one who finds the baby Jesus in their slice of cake is said to receive luck and prosperity, and is responsible for baking or purchasing the next year's cake, or for throwing the next Mardi Gras party. In some traditions, the finder of the baby is designated "king" or "queen" for the evening.

As plastic babies replaced beans and porcelain figures, commercial bakers have begun placing the baby outside of the cake, and leaving the hiding to the customer. This is also because there is a potential of customers choking on or swallowing the baby, for which bakers want to avoid liability.

== Gallery ==
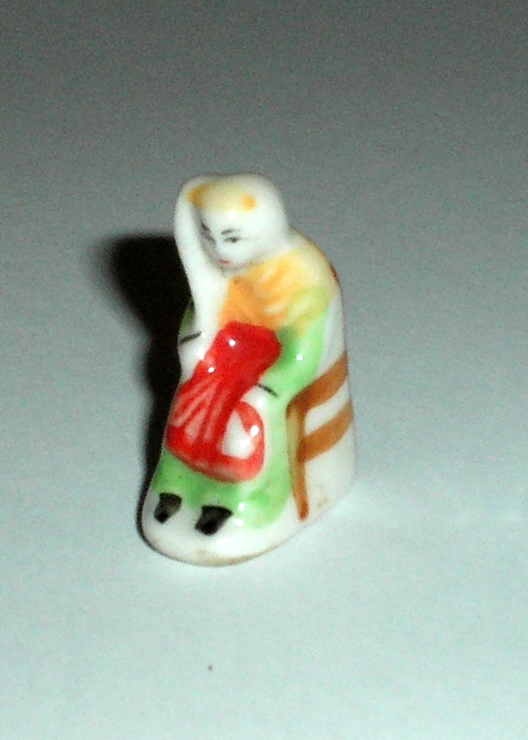
Vintage French fève

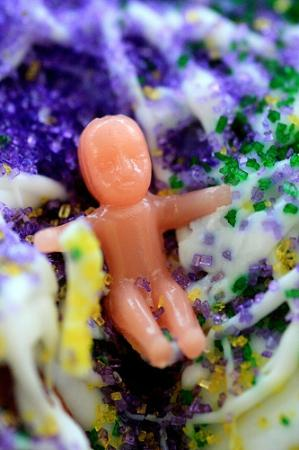
Modern king cake fève in the shape of a baby

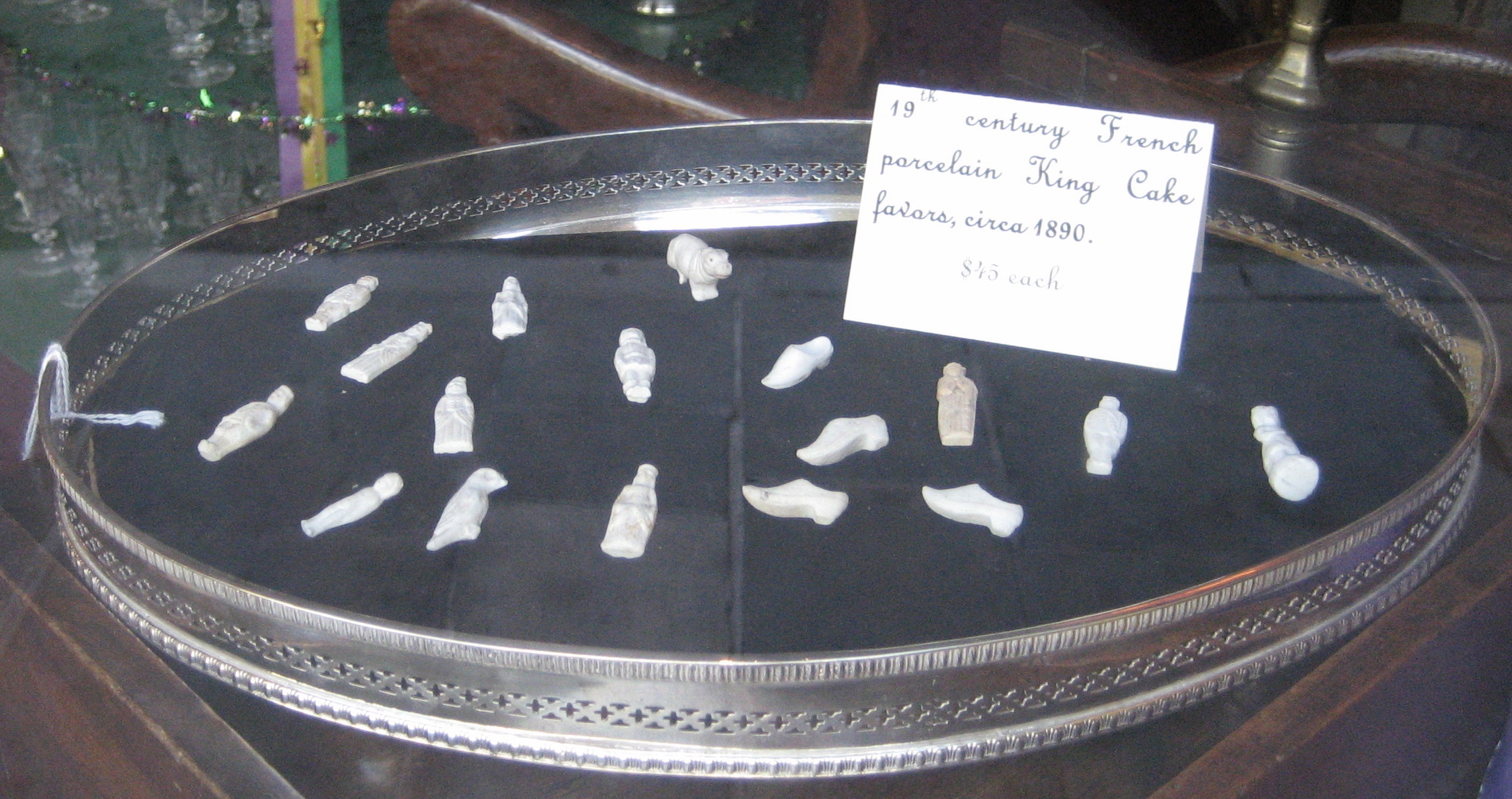
Vintage 19th century fèves from New Orleans

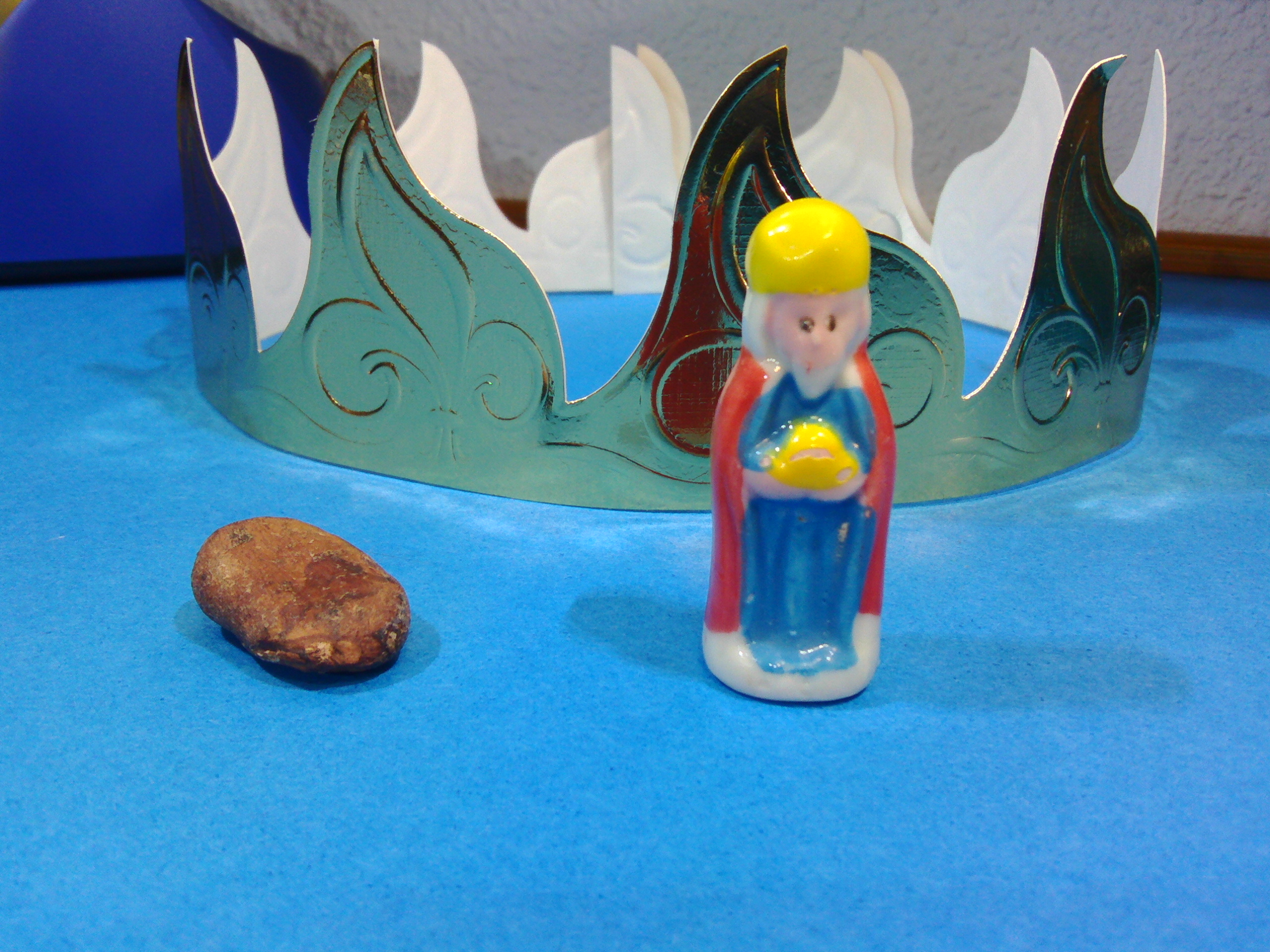
King and bean from a Spanish rosca de reyes

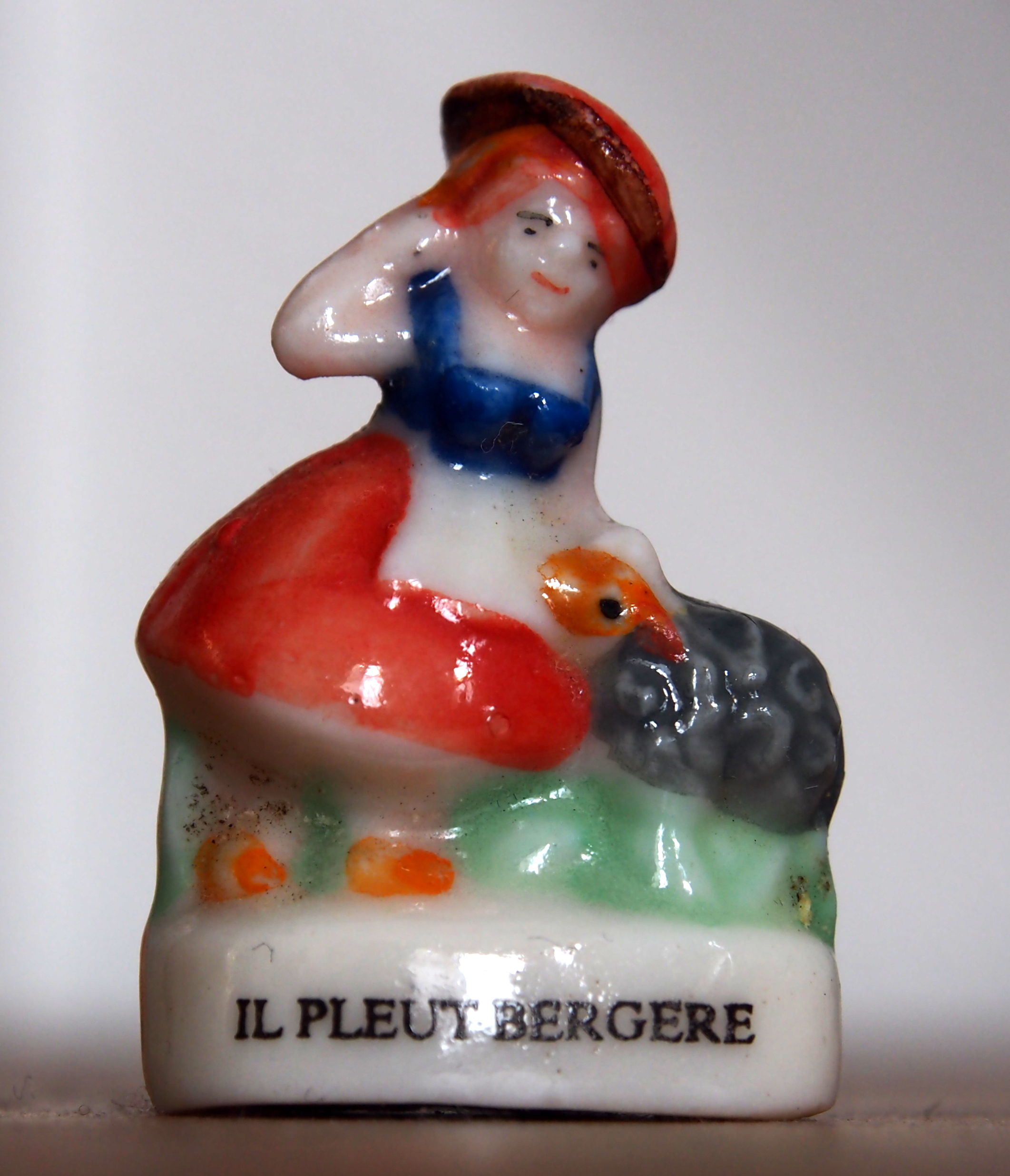
French fève

== Cakes that contain fèves ==
- King cake
- Rosca de reyes
- Bolo-rei
- Tortell
- Vasilopita
