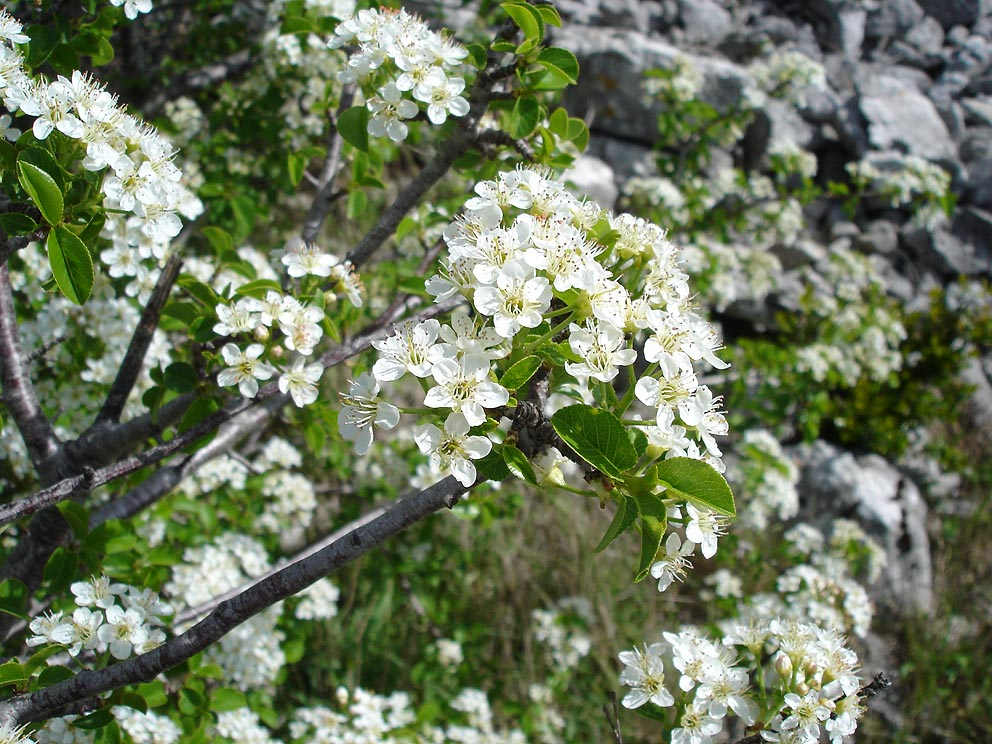
- Spring flowers of St Lucie cherry, at Opoul-Périllos, Roussillon, France

Conservation status
- Least Concern (IUCN 3.1)

Scientific classification
- Kingdom: Plantae
- Clade: Tracheophytes
- Clade: Angiosperms
- Clade: Eudicots
- Clade: Rosids
- Order: Rosales
- Family: Rosaceae
- Genus: Prunus
- Subgenus: Prunus subg. Cerasus
- Species: P. mahaleb

Binomial name
- Prunus mahaleb L.

Subspecies
- See text.
- Distribution map

Synonyms
- Of the species: Cerasus mahaleb (L.) Mill.; Mahaleb vulgaris Takht.; Padellus mahaleb (L.) Vassilcz.; Padus mahaleb (L.) Borkh.; Of subsp. cupaniana: Padellus mahaleb subsp. cupaniana (Guss.) Pénzes; Prunus cupaniana Guss.; Of subsp. mahaleb: Cerasus corymbosa St.-Lag.; Druparia mahaleb Clairv.; Padellus mahaleb subsp. simonkaii (Pénzes) Soják; Padus monstrosa Dippel; Prunus mahaleb subsp. baldaccii Pénzes; Prunus mahaleb subsp. simonkaii Pénzes; Prunus odorata Lam.

= Prunus mahaleb =

Species of cherry tree

Prunus mahaleb, the St Lucie cherry or mahaleb cherry, is a species of cherry, native to central and southern Europe, northwest Africa, southwest Asia, and parts of central Asia. The tree is cultivated for a spice obtained from the seeds inside the cherry stones. The seeds have a fragrant scent and have a taste comparable to bitter almonds with cherry notes.

== Description ==
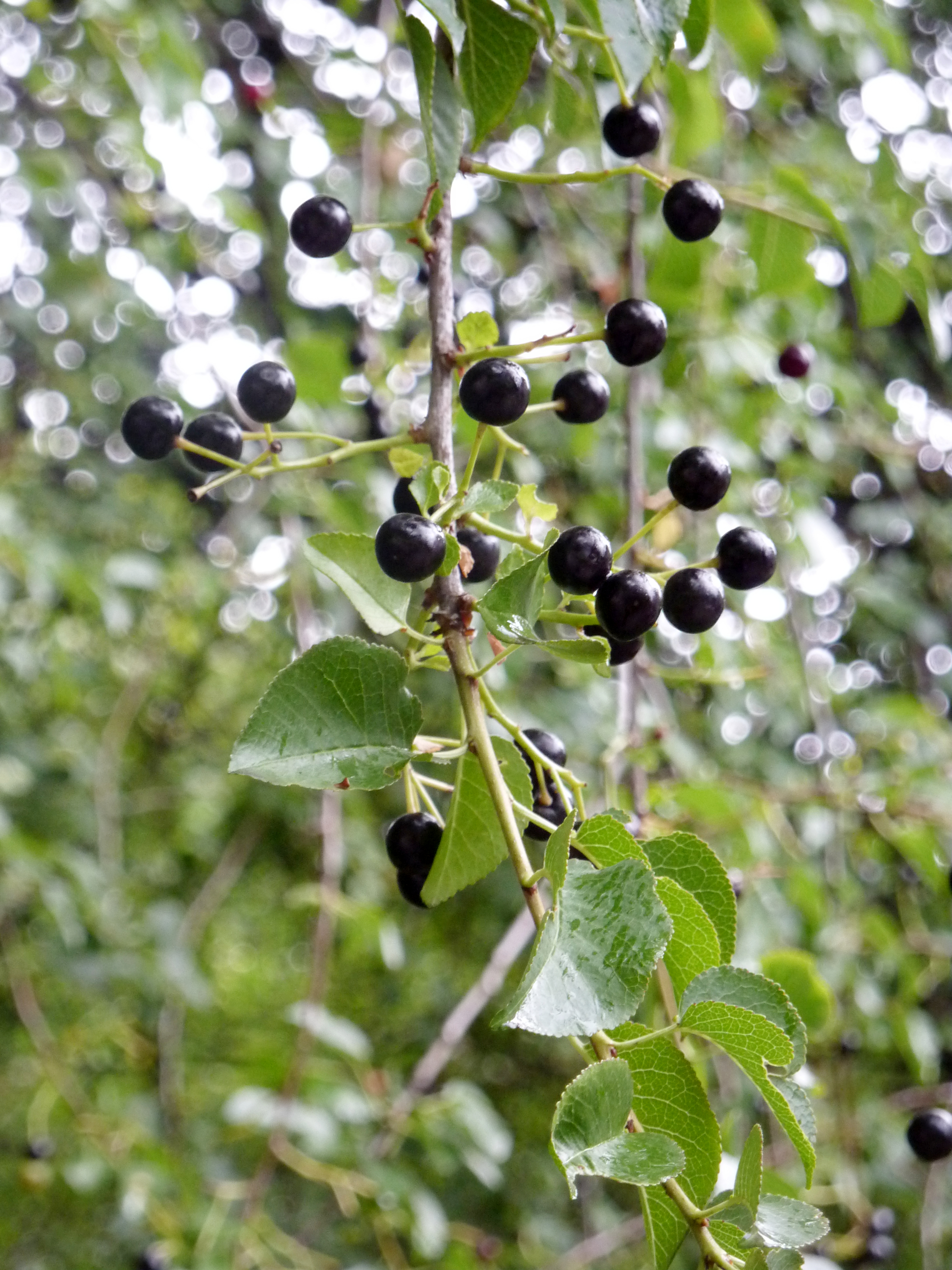
St Lucie cherry fruit, Germany

It is a deciduous tree or large shrub, growing to 2–10 m (rarely up to 12 m) tall with a trunk up to 40 cm diameter. The bark is grey-brown, with conspicuous lenticels on young stems, and shallowly fissured on old trunks. The leaves are 1.5–5 centimetres (1/2–2 inches) long, 1–4 cm. wide, alternate, clustered at the end of alternately arranged twigs, ovate to cordate, pointed, have serrate edges, longitudinal venation and are glabrous and green. The petiole is 5–20 millimetres long, and may or may not have two glands. The flowers are fragrant, pure white, small, 8–20 mm diameter, with an 8–15 mm pedicel; they are arranged 3–10 together on a 3–4 cm long raceme. The flower pollination is mainly by bees. The fruit is a small thin-fleshed cherry-like drupe 8–10 mm in diameter, green at first, turning red then dark purple to black when mature, with a very bitter flavour; flowering is in mid spring with the fruit ripening in mid to late summer.

It demonstrates selective fruit abortion, producing a high proportion of excess flowers that result in low fruit set levels. This reduces the number of "poor quality" fruit and increases the viability of its seeds.

== Subspecies ==
As of February 2023, two subspecies were accepted by Plants of the World Online:

- Prunus mahaleb subsp. cupaniana (Guss.) Arcang. (synonyms include Prunus cupaniana) – restricted to northern Sicily
- Prunus mahaleb subsp. mahaleb (synonyms include Prunus odorata) – elsewhere in the native range of the species

== Distribution and habitat ==
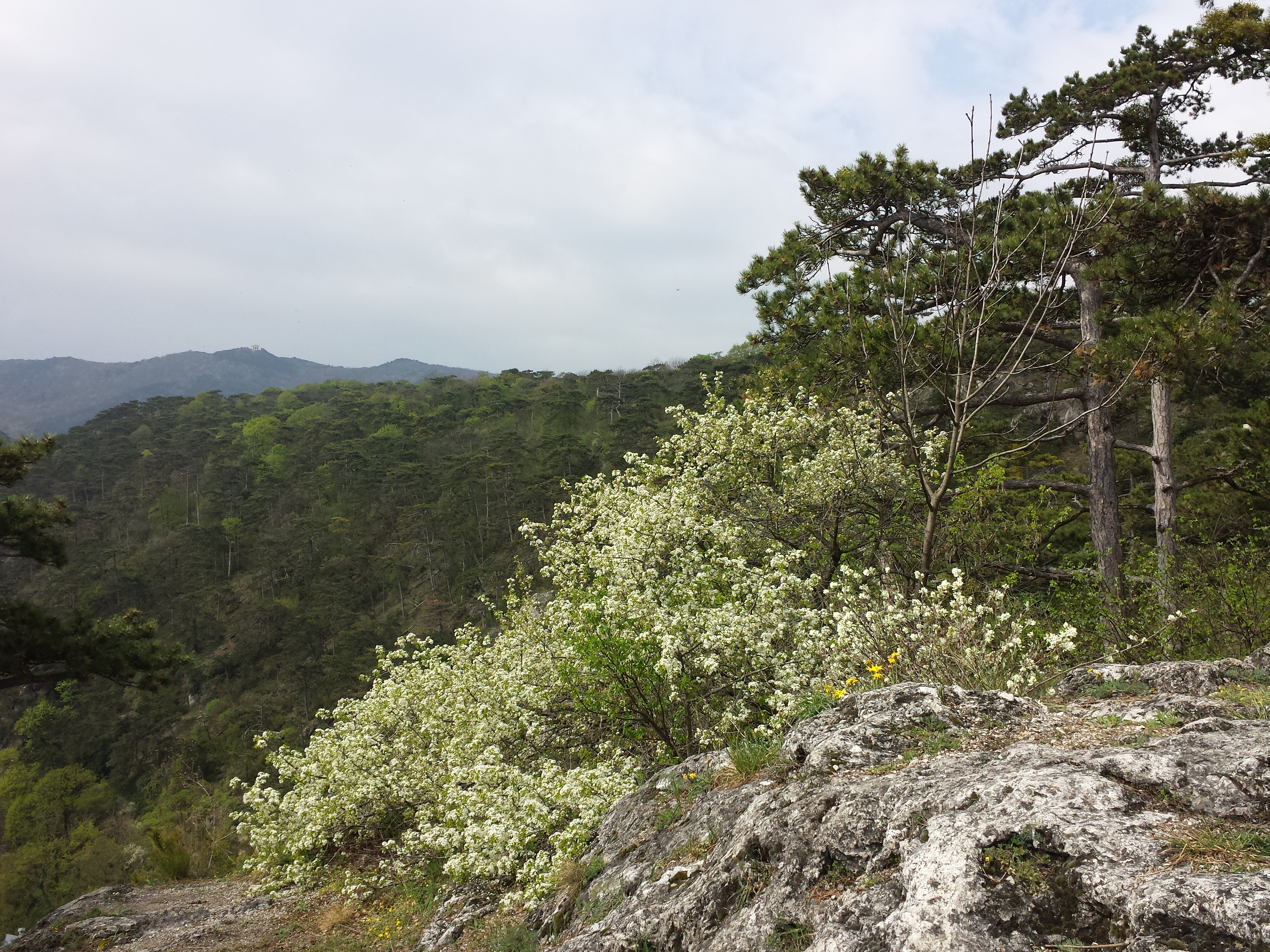
Plants in flower in native habitat, Mödlinger Klause, Mödling District, Lower Austria

Prunus mahaleb occurs in thickets and open woodland on dry slopes; in central Europe at altitudes up to 1,700 m (5,600 ft), and in highlands at 1,200–2,000 m in southern Europe. It has become naturalised in some temperate areas, including Europe north of its native range (north to Great Britain and Sweden), and locally in Australia and the United States. mahaleb cherry

== Ecology ==
A scientific study discovered an ecological dependence between the plant and four species of frugivorous birds in southeastern Spain; blackbirds and blackcaps proved to be the most important seed dispersers. When P. mahaleb is fruiting, these birds consume the fruit almost exclusively, and disperse the seeds to the locations favourable for the tree's growth. The way in which some birds consume the fruit, and the habitats those birds use, may act as a selective force in determining which genetic variations of the cherry flourish.

== Cultivation ==
Away from its native range, the species is grown as an ornamental tree for its strongly fragrant flowers, throughout temperate regions of the world. A number of cultivars have been selected for their ornamental value, including 'Albomarginata', with variegated foliage, 'Bommii', a dwarf with strongly pendulous branches, 'Globosa', a compact dwarf clone, 'Pendula', with drooping branching, and 'Xanthocarpa' with yellow fruit. It has also been used as a rootstock for grafting other cherries on.

== Uses ==
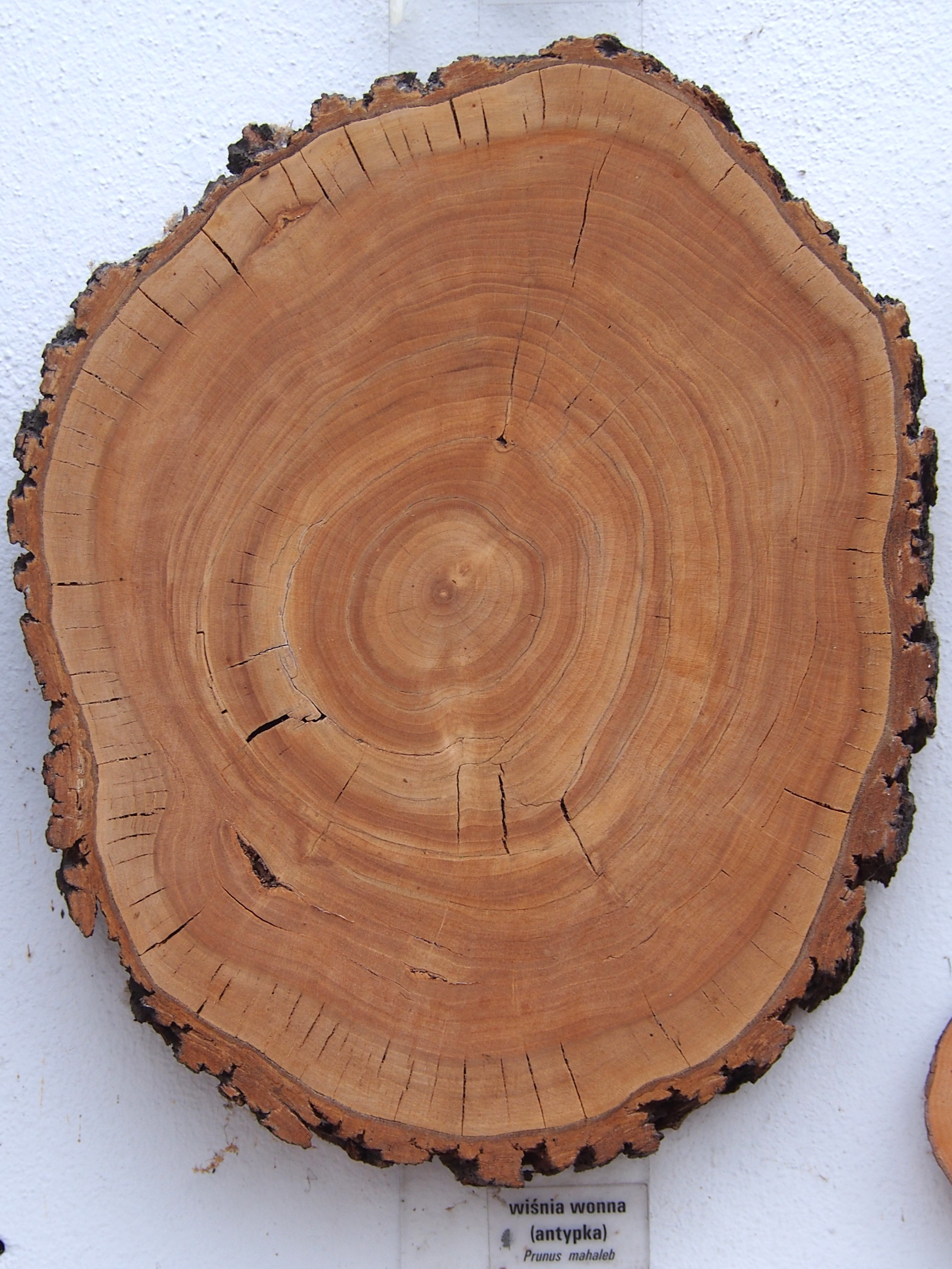
Crosscut wood of St Lucie cherry

The plant is also cultivated for mahleb, a spice obtained from the seeds inside the cherry stones. It is fragrant and has the taste of bitter almonds. It is used in small quantities to sharpen sweet foods, such as the Turkish sweet-bread çörek (chorak), the Greek sweet-bread tsoureki or the Armenian sweet-bread chorak. The chemical constituents are still uncertain, but the spice is prepared from the seeds, either by grinding and powdering the seed kernels, or in oil extracted from the seeds.

The wood is hard, and is used in cabinet-making and for pipes.

The bark, wood, and seeds contain coumarin. They have anti-inflammatory, sedative and vasodilation effects.

== History ==
Prunus mahaleb is a likely candidate for the ḫalub-tree mentioned in early Sumerian writings, a durable fruit-bearing hardwood with seeds and leaves known for their medicinal properties and associated with the goddess Inana. The Arabic محلب mahleb or mahlab meaning the mahaleb cherry is in medieval Islamic writings by among others Al-Razi (died 925 or 932), Ibn al-Baitar (died 1248) and Ibn al-Awwam. Ibn Al-Awwam in his book on agriculture dated late 12th century described how to cultivate the mahaleb tree: he says the tree is a vigorous grower, easy to grow, but a thing to watch out for is that it is not resistant to prolonged drought. He also described how to prepare the mahaleb seeds by boiling them in sugared water. The word, and probably the mahaleb itself, does not appear in classical Latin, nor early or mid medieval Latin, and is rare in late medieval Latin. One early record in Latin is year 1317 in an encyclopedia by Matthaeus Silvaticus who wrote that the "mahaleb" is the kernel seed of the fruit of both domesticated and wild cherry trees in Arabic countries. Another early record in Latin is in a medical-botany book by Ioannis Mesuae in 1479 spelled almahaleb (where "al-" is the Arabic definite article). In 1593 the Latin botanist Carolus Clusius spelled it mahaleb. Today its cultivation and use is largely restricted to the region that in the 19th and earlier centuries formed the Ottoman Empire. Syria is the main exporting country.
