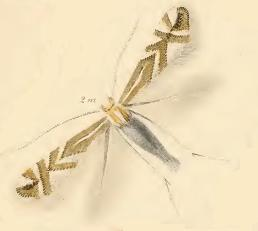

Scientific classification
- Domain: Eukaryota
- Kingdom: Animalia
- Phylum: Arthropoda
- Class: Insecta
- Order: Lepidoptera
- Family: Gracillariidae
- Genus: Phyllonorycter
- Species: P. spinicolella

Binomial name
- Phyllonorycter spinicolella (Zeller, 1846)

Synonyms
- Lithocolletis spinicolella Zeller, 1846

= Phyllonorycter spinicolella =

Species of moth

Phyllonorycter spinicolella, also known as the sloe midget, is a moth of the family Gracillariidae, first described by the German entomologist Philipp Christoph Zeller in 1846. It is probably present in all of Europe.

The wingspan is 6–8 mm. The posterior tarsi are whitish. Forewings are golden-ochreous; a white median streak from base to near middle, dark-margined above; dorsum narrowly white towards base; four costal and three dorsal shining white anteriorly dark-margined wedge-shaped spots, first dorsal sometimes connected with basal streak; a blackish elongate apical dot. Hindwings are light grey. The larva is green- whitish; dorsal line dark green; head pale greenish.

It is very similar to Phyllonorycter cerasicolella and study of the genitalia is essential for determination.

Adults are on wing in May and again in August in two generations per year.

The larvae feed on cherry plum (Prunus cerasifera), European plum (Prunus domestica), bird cherry (Prunus padus) and blackthorn (Prunus spinosa). They mine the leaves of their host plant.
