= Cardamom bread =

Bread flavored with cardamom

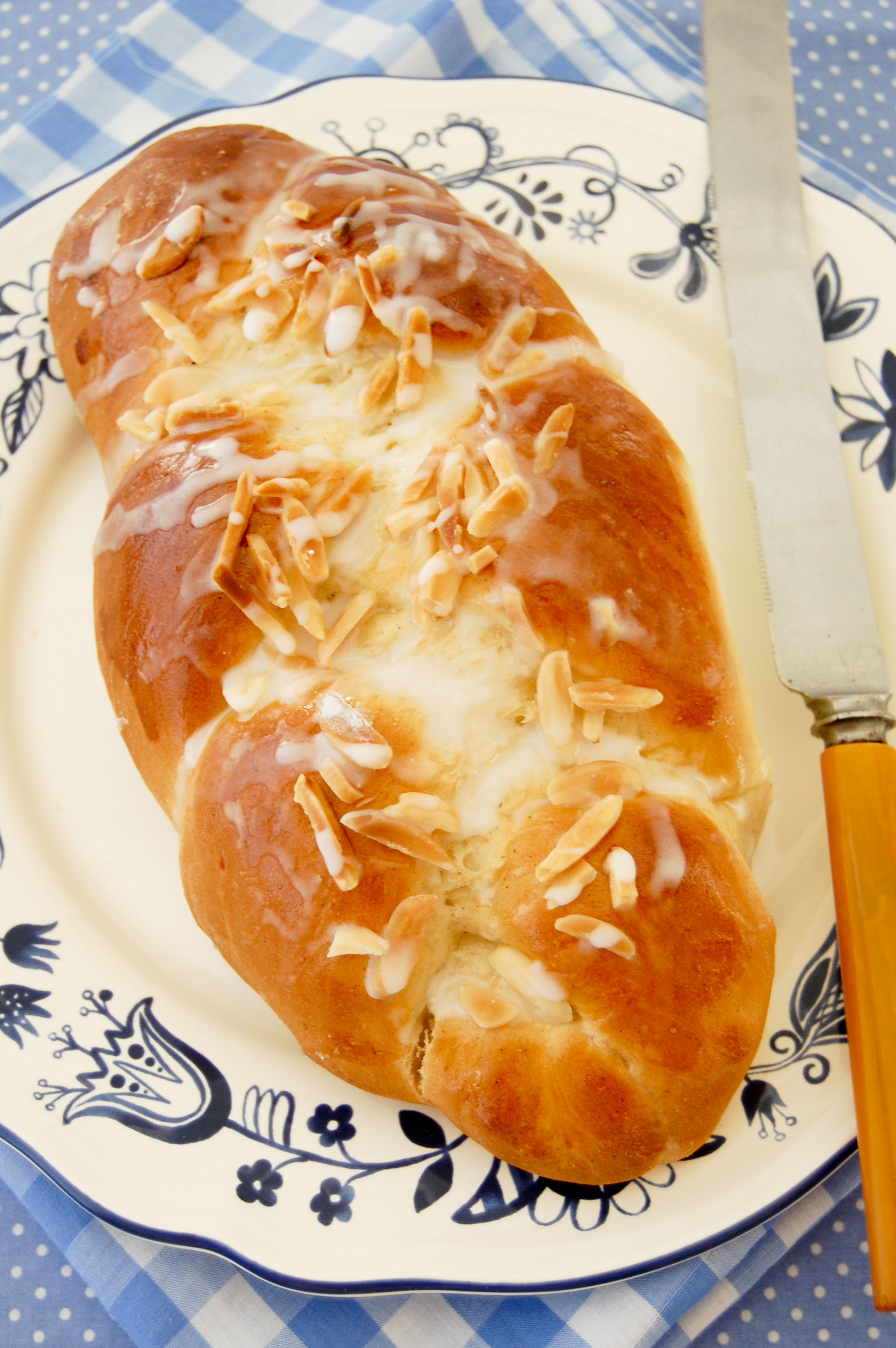
- Finnish pulla cardamom bread
- Type: Sweet bread
- Place of origin: Finland, Sweden
- Main ingredients: Cardamom

Cardamom breads, including the Finnish pulla (or nisu) and Swedish kardemummabröd and kardemummabullar, are a group of enriched breads flavored with cardamom. They are eaten throughout the year, typically with coffee or tea.

Cardamom is a spice used in several Nordic countries in cakes, cookies, and biscuits, including traditional Finnish Christmas pastries.

== Pulla ==
Pulla
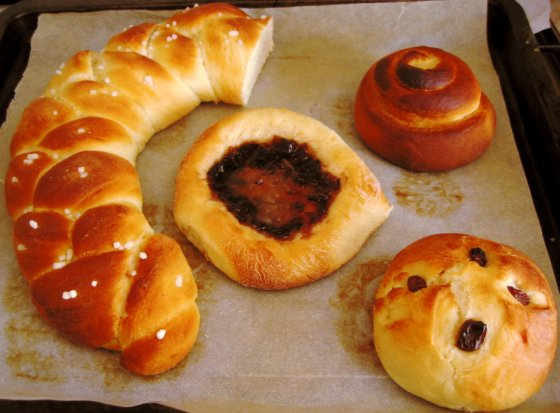
- Several pulla loaves (dark roast (tummapaahto) in the top-right corner)
- Alternative names: nisu, vehnänen
- Type: Sweet roll
- Place of origin: Finland
- Main ingredients: cardamom seeds; raisins or sliced almonds

Pulla (Finnish pronunciation: [ˈpulːɑ]) is a mildly sweet Finnish sweet roll or dessert bread flavored with crushed cardamom seeds and occasionally raisins or sliced almonds. Braided loaves (pitko) are formed from three or more strands of dough. The loaves may also be formed into a ring. They are typically coated with egg wash and then sprinkled with white sugar or almonds. Other types of pulla include small round buns that resemble English scones but have a sugar and butter topping, and larger cinnamon rolls called korvapuusti. The outside typically has a shiny, brown glaze, formed by a coating of egg white, milk or a mixture of sugar and brewed coffee.

Usually pulla is baked as a small, round, brioche-style loaf, which is served whole, or as a long loaf called pullapitko, which is sliced, and can be braided to make it more decorative and festive. Some variations are topping it with chopped walnuts and vanilla icing, raisins added to the dough, cinnamon rolls (called korvapuusti, sometimes topped with pearl sugar or almond flakes), butter and sugar buns called voisilmäpulla, berry toppings and curd filled buns called rahkapulla. For special occasions, saffron may be added to the dough to impart flavour and a yellow tint.

In Finland, pulla is often served with coffee. In cafeterias, the quality of the pulla is considered a sign of the establishment's overall quality.

Pulla is also common in the Upper Peninsula of Michigan and Northern Ontario, areas in the United States and Canada which have large Finnish populations. There it is also commonly known as nisu, an old Finnish word still in use with the same meaning in some dialects, despite originally simply meaning 'wheat'. The term korppu refers instead to a biscotti-like, double-baked breadstick for dunking in coffee that is often made from leftover nisu.

== In Sweden ==
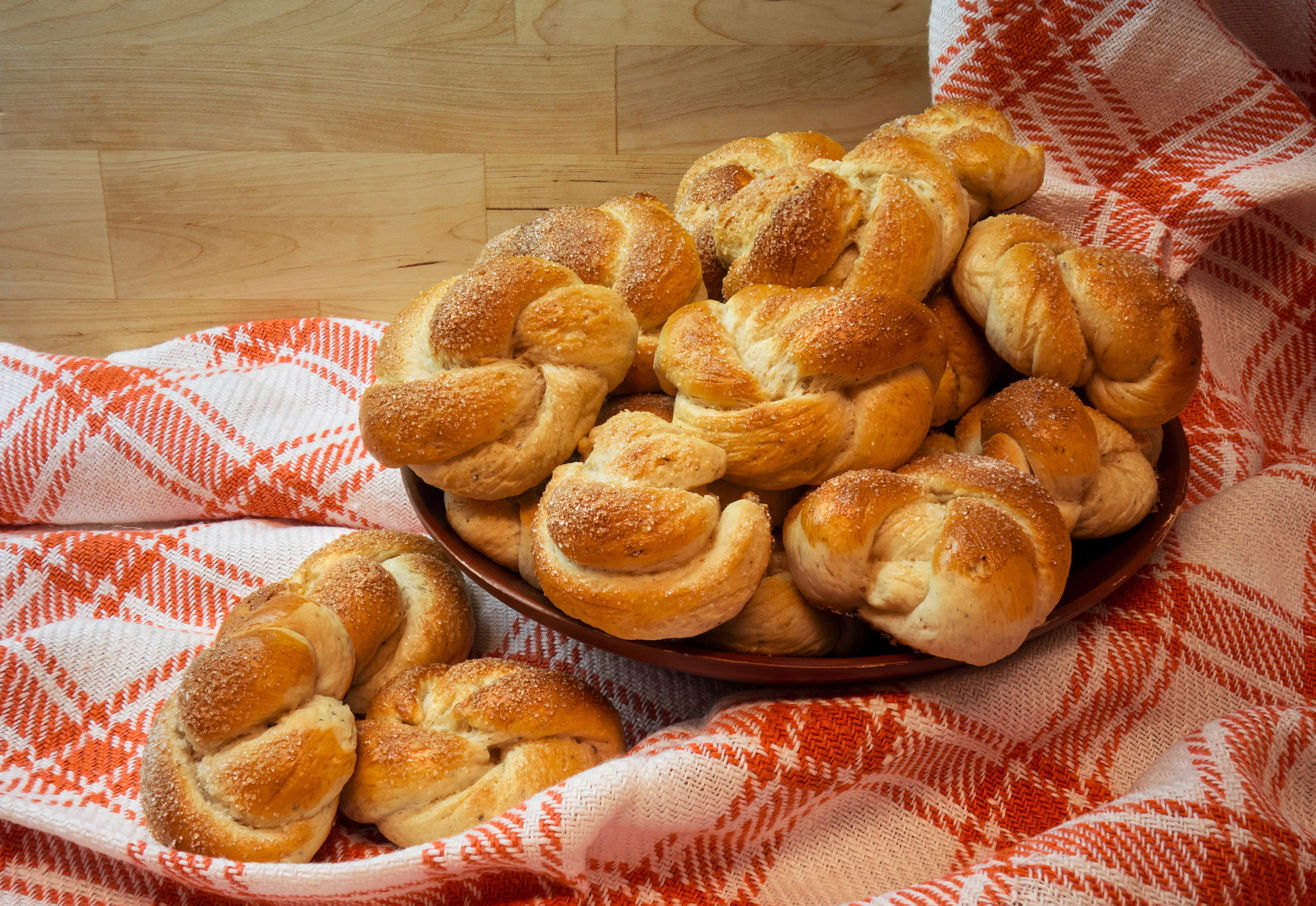
Swedish cardamom buns

Swedish cardamom breads include kardemummabröd (bread) and kardemummabullar (buns).

Cardamom bread is considered a traditional food among Swedish Americans. Cardamom buns are eaten along with coffee or tea.

== See also ==
- Tsoureki
- Challah
- Bejgli
