= King cake =

Type of cake associated with Epiphany

- Two slices of a Manny Randazzo King Cake, with a plastic infant "King" on top, from Metairie, Louisiana, United States
- Type: Cake, Viennoiserie
- Place of origin: Latin Europe
- Region or state: France, Portugal, Spain, Latin America, New Orleans
- Similar dishes: Jésuite; conversation tart

A king cake, also known as a three kings cake or a baby cake, is a cake associated in many countries with the Epiphany, the celebration of the Twelfth Night after Christmas. Traditionally made with brioche dough, in most cases a fève (lit. 'fava bean'), such as a figurine representing Christ as a child, was hidden inside. After the cake is cut, whoever finds the fève in their slice wins a prize.

== History ==
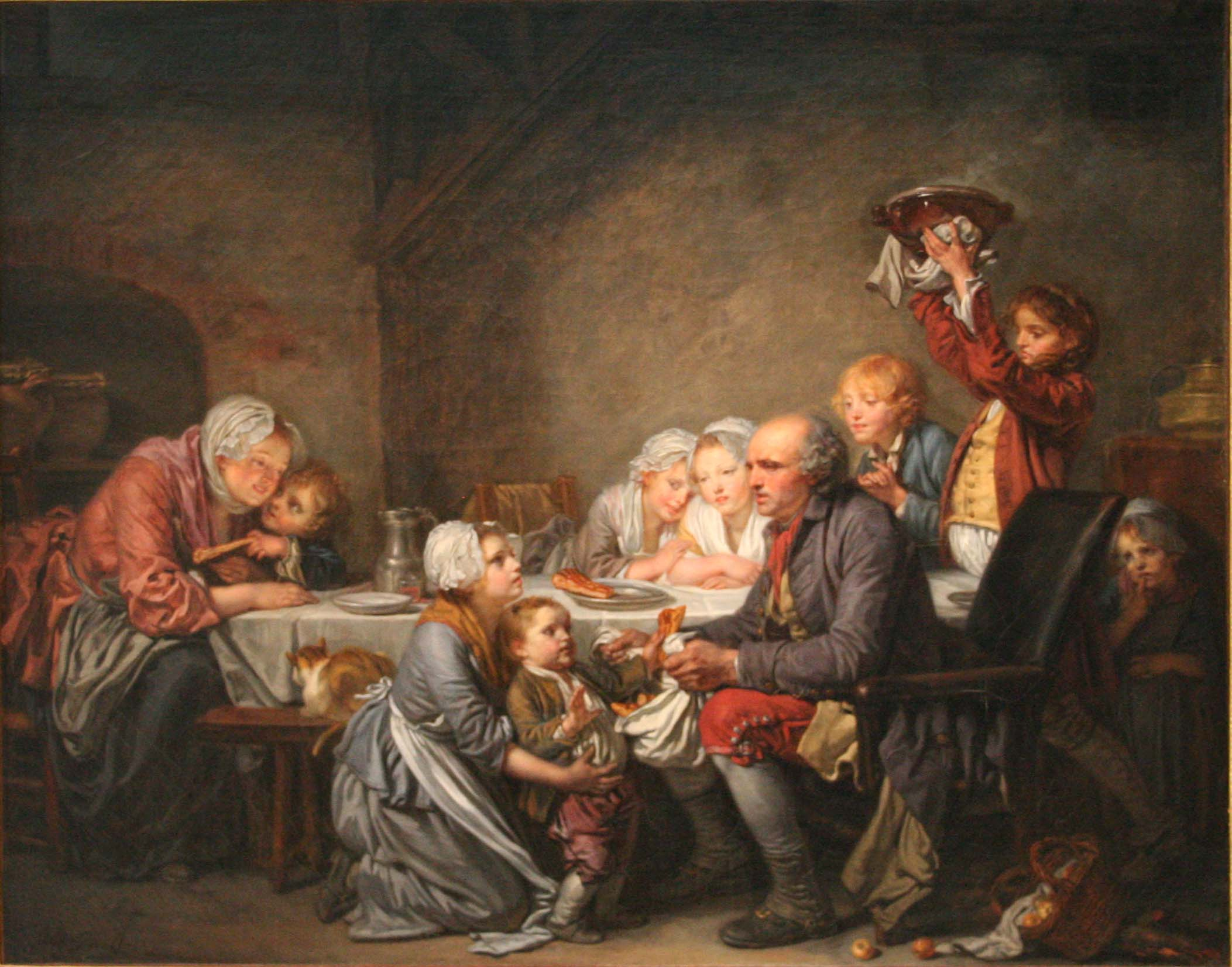
Le gâteau des Rois, by Jean-Baptiste Greuze, 1774 (Musée Fabre)

The origin of the cake tradition was popularly believed to be related to the Roman Saturnalia. These were festivals dedicated to the god Saturn so that the Roman people, in general could celebrate the longer days that began to come after the winter solstice. For this reason, Margaret Hasluck disputed the Greek tradition commemorating St. Basil's feast day with vasilopita, claiming that both customs had a common origin in the Saturnalia and Kronia.

In the Middle Ages, it was said that the king who was chosen had to pay the assembly a general round of drinks. To prevent cheating, the edible bean was replaced by a porcelain bean. In Christian tradition the cake commemorates the witness of the "Three Kings".

The earliest known reference to a king cake in North America, including a recipe, dates to 1649. An early French settler of Port Royal, Acadia (now Annapolis Royal, Nova Scotia), was required to deliver annually to the lord of Port Royal and his wife, "on the eve of the Feast of Kings ... a round cake made with a quarter bushel of the finest white wheat flour, kneaded with six eggs and half a pound of the freshest butter, with a black bean placed in the cake’s edge ... to their château and seigneurial manor at Port Royal."

In the U.S., the tradition of the Mardi Gras king cake did not become established until the 20th-century, although the ubiquitous gold, purple and green sprinkles have been standard decoration since 1872. The cake is usually purchased at a shop. Many holiday foods have rituals and customs connected to the preparation of the food, but the customs of the kings cake mainly revolve around the fève. Sugar was always a big industry in New Orleans, where local bakeries took an active role in turning the cake into a modern cultural icon. Old-fashioned versions of the cake are basically a round braided brioche without filling but these days bakeries try to outdo one another with creative fillings.

== Regional variants ==
=== French-speaking countries and regions ===
There are two different versions of the French king cake: the galette and the gâteau. The galette des rois is a flaky puff pastry traditionally filled with frangipane. These days the filling may also be fruit, chocolate or cream-based fillings. It has become a tradition for pastry chefs to create innovative versions of the galette featuring ingredients like flavored liquors, candied fruits and ganache.

The gâteau des rois (referred to as royaume, brioche des rois, or coque des rois) is mainly popular in the Occitan-speaking regions of the south of France. It is a crown-shaped brioche dough decorated with candied fruit and coarse sugar.

The Guianan galette (more commonly known as the Creole galette) is a traditional pastry of French Guianan cuisine. This is a Creole variant of the galette des rois which is eaten as a dessert during Epiphany. It can be garnished with cream, coconut, guava, etc. It is consumed throughout the Carnival period (from the Epiphany until Ash Wednesday) and preferably accompanied by champagne.

A paper crown is included with purchased cakes to crown the "king" or "queen" who finds the "fève" or bean, or coin hidden inside the cake. To ensure a random distribution of the pieces, the youngest person is to place themselves under the table and name the recipient of each piece as they are cut. When store-bought, the fève can be a tiny porcelain figurine of a religious character or, nowadays, a figurine referencing pop-culture or popular cartoons.

=== German-speaking countries ===
The German and Swiss Dreikönigskuchen, or three kings cakes, are shaped like wreathes or rounds, and use an almond as the fève.

=== Portugal ===
Bolo-rei (lit. 'king cake') is a traditional Portuguese cake eaten from the beginning of December until Epiphany. The recipe is derived from the Southern French gâteau des rois, which found its way to Portugal when Confeitaria Nacional opened as the Portuguese monarchy's official bakery in 1829.

The cake is round with a large hole in the centre, resembling a crown covered with crystallized and dried fruit. It is baked from a soft, white dough, with raisins, various nuts and crystallized fruit. Also included is the dried fava bean, and tradition dictates that whoever finds the fava has to pay for the cake next year.

=== Roscón de reyes ===
Variations of the roscón de reyes are eaten in Spain and Latin America around January 6th. They generally have an oval shape due to the need to make cakes large enough for large groups. For decoration, figs, quinces, cherries, or dried and candied fruits are often, but not exclusively, used.

In Spain the cake consists of a sweet brioche dough aromatised with orange blossom water and decorated with slices of candied or crystallized fruit of various colors. It can be filled with whipped cream, cream, almond paste or others. The figurine traditionally represents one of the Three Wise Men Biblical Magi. A dry broad bean is also introduced inside the roscón. It is tradition that whoever finds the bean pays for the roscón.

In Mexico, Central and South America, the figurine represents the Child Jesus. The figurine of the baby Jesus hidden in the bread represents the flight of the Holy Family, fleeing from Herod the Great's Massacre of the Innocents. Whoever finds the baby Jesus figurine is blessed and must take the figurine to the nearest church on Candlemas Day or host a party that day.

=== United Kingdom ===
The Twelfth cake, Twelfth-night cake, or Twelfth-tide cake was once popular in the United Kingdom on Twelfth Night. It was frequently baked with a bean hidden in one side and a pea hidden in the other; the man/lord finding the bean became King for the night, while the woman/lady finding the pea became the Queen – also known as the Lord or Lady of Misrule. Earlier, in the time of Shakespeare, there was only a Lord of Misrule, chosen by the hidden bean, reflected in Shakespeare's play Twelfth Night.

Samuel Pepys recorded a party in London on Epiphany night 1659/1660, and described the role the cake played in the choosing of a "King" and "Queen" for the occasion: "to my cousin Stradwick, where, after a good supper, there being there my father, mother, brothers, and sister, my cousin Scott and his wife, Mr. Drawwater and his wife, and her brother, Mr. Stradwick, we had a brave cake brought us, and in the choosing, Pall was Queen and Mr. Stradwick was King. After that my wife and I bid adieu and came home, it being still a great frost."

Although still occasionally found in the United Kingdom, as the Industrial Revolution curtailed the celebration of the 12 days of Christmas during the Victorian era, the cake declined in popularity to be replaced by the Christmas cake. 18th century actor Robert Baddeley's will bequeathed £3 per annum to serve wine, punch and a Twelfth Night cake to the performers of the Drury Lane Theatre in the green room each Twelfth Night; the ceremony of the "Baddeley Cake" has remained a regular event, missed only 13 times in over 200 years, during wartimes or theatre closures.

=== United States ===
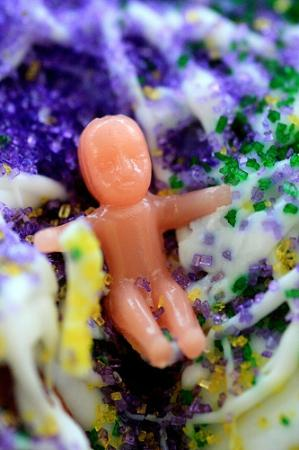
Baby figure popularly used in Louisiana (U.S.) king cake

In Louisiana and parts of the Gulf Coast region historically settled by the French, king cake is associated with Mardi Gras and is traditionally served from Epiphany until Carnival and recently year-round. It may have been introduced by Basque settlers in 1718, or by the French in 1870.

It comes in a number of styles. The simplest, said to be the most traditional, is a ring of twisted cinnamon roll-style dough. It may be topped with icing or sugar, which may be colored to show the traditional Mardi Gras colors of purple for justice, green for faith, and gold for power. Cakes may also be filled with cream cheese, praline, cinnamon, or an assortment of fruit fillings.

Traditionally, a small plastic baby symbolizing Jesus is hidden in the king cake. The baby symbolizes luck and prosperity to whoever finds it. That person is also responsible for purchasing next year's cake or hosting the next Mardi Gras party. Often, bakers place the baby outside of the cake, leaving the purchaser to hide it themselves. This is usually to avoid liability for any choking hazard.

In 2009, the New Orleans Pelicans basketball team introduced the King Cake Baby as a seasonal mascot. The New Orleans Baby Cakes (formerly the Zephyrs) were a AAA baseball team that played their final three seasons (2017–2019) with that name before relocating and becoming the Wichita Wind Surge.

== Gallery ==
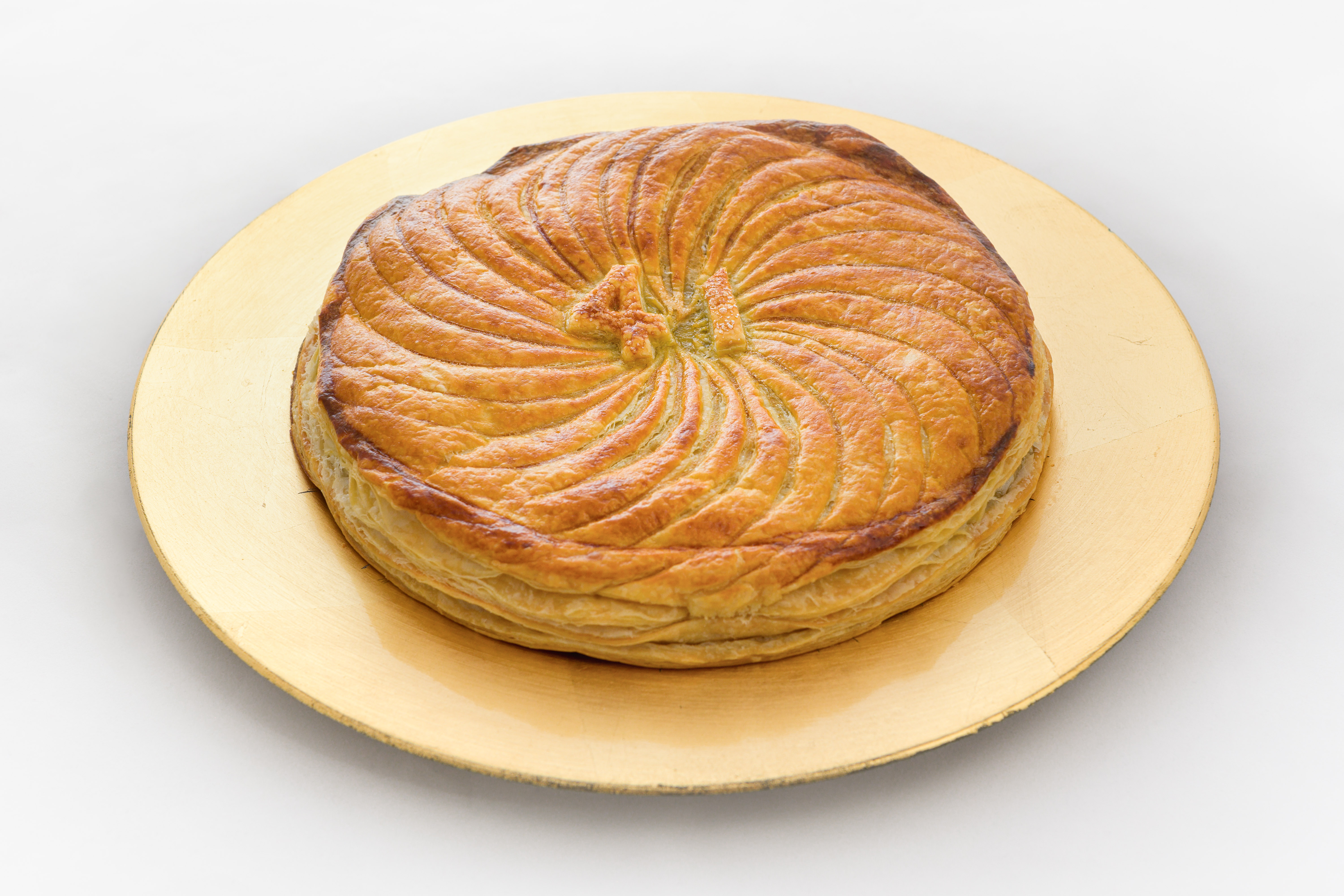
Northern French style galette des rois

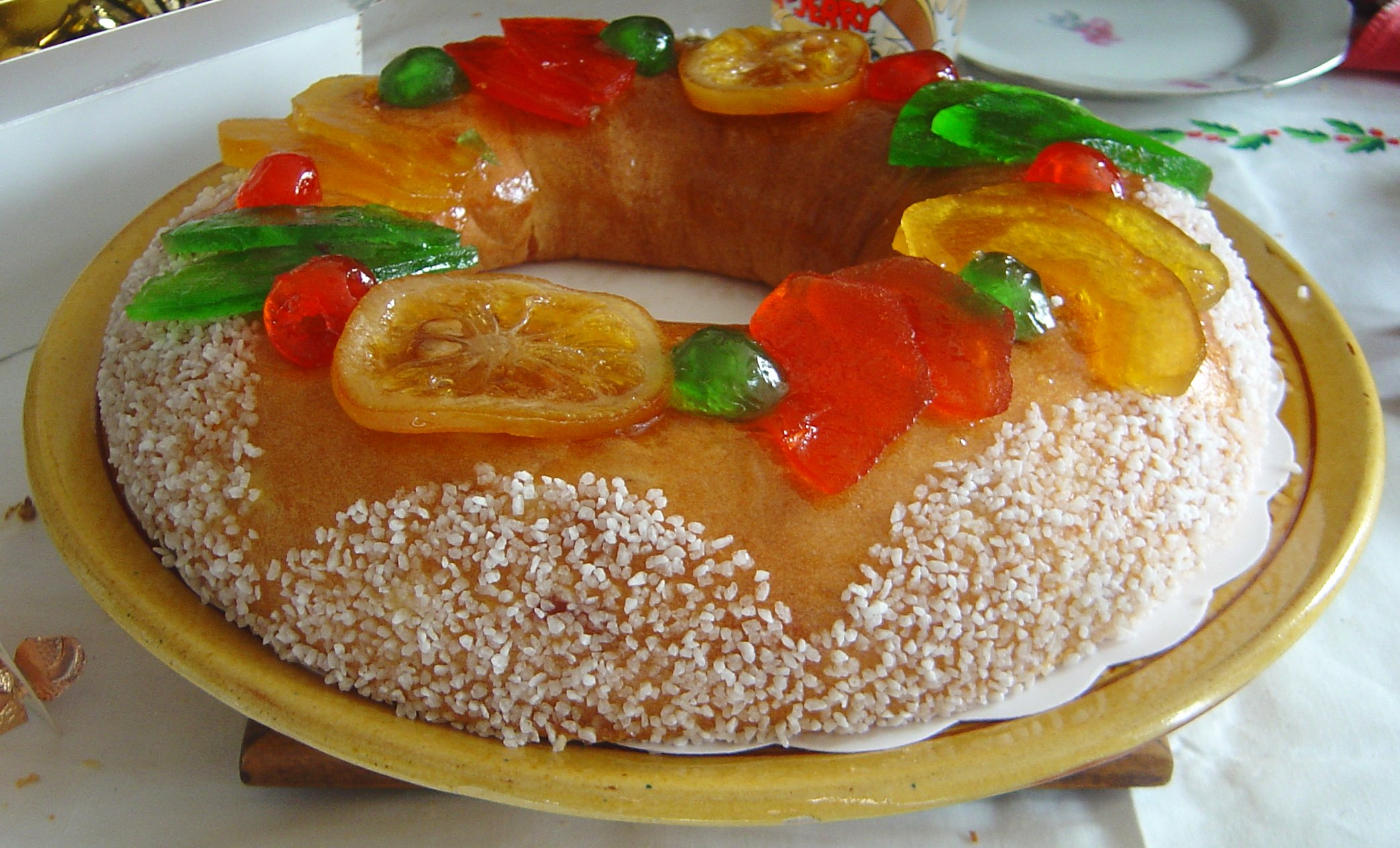
Southern French style gâteau des rois

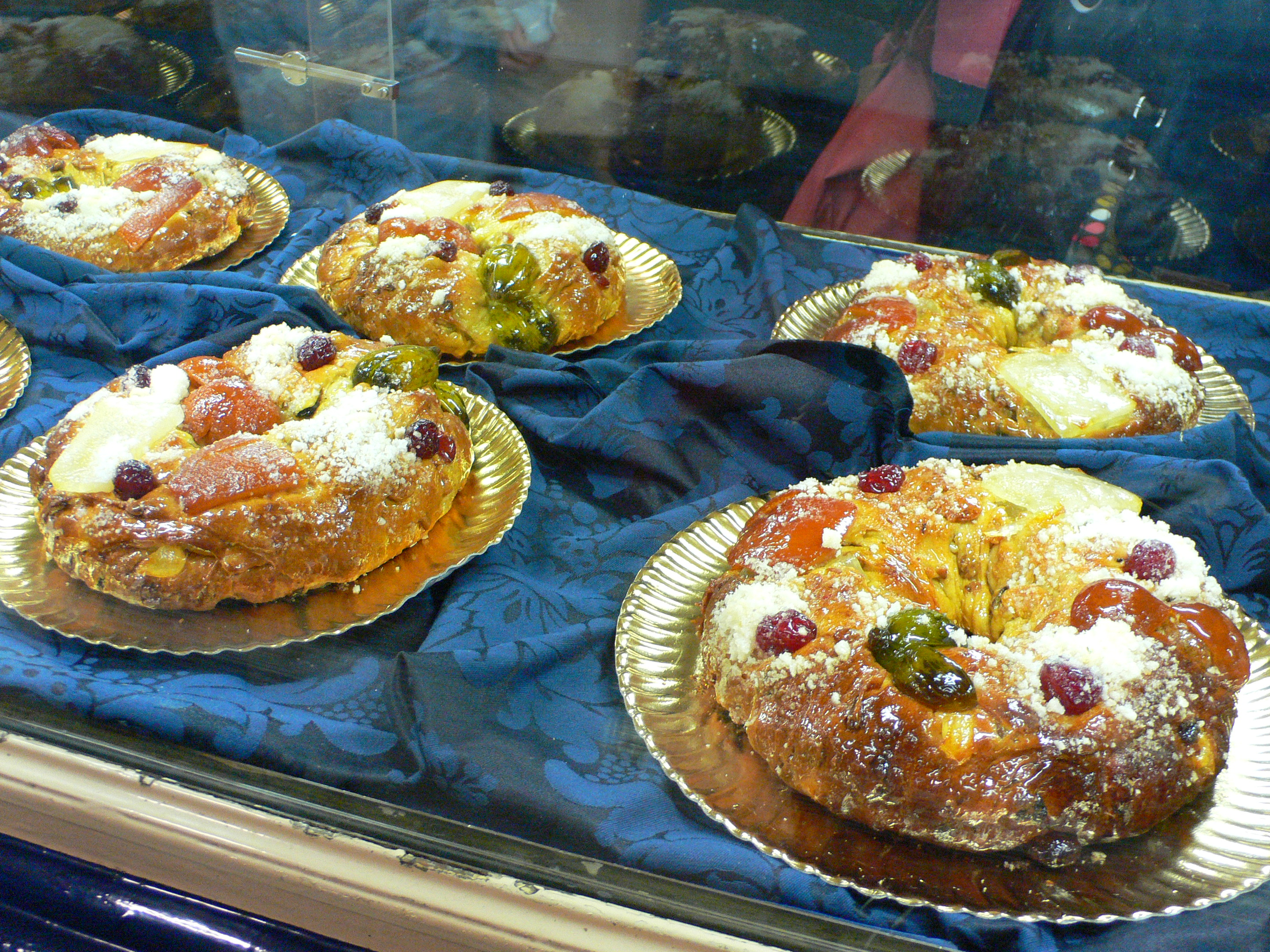
Bolo-rei

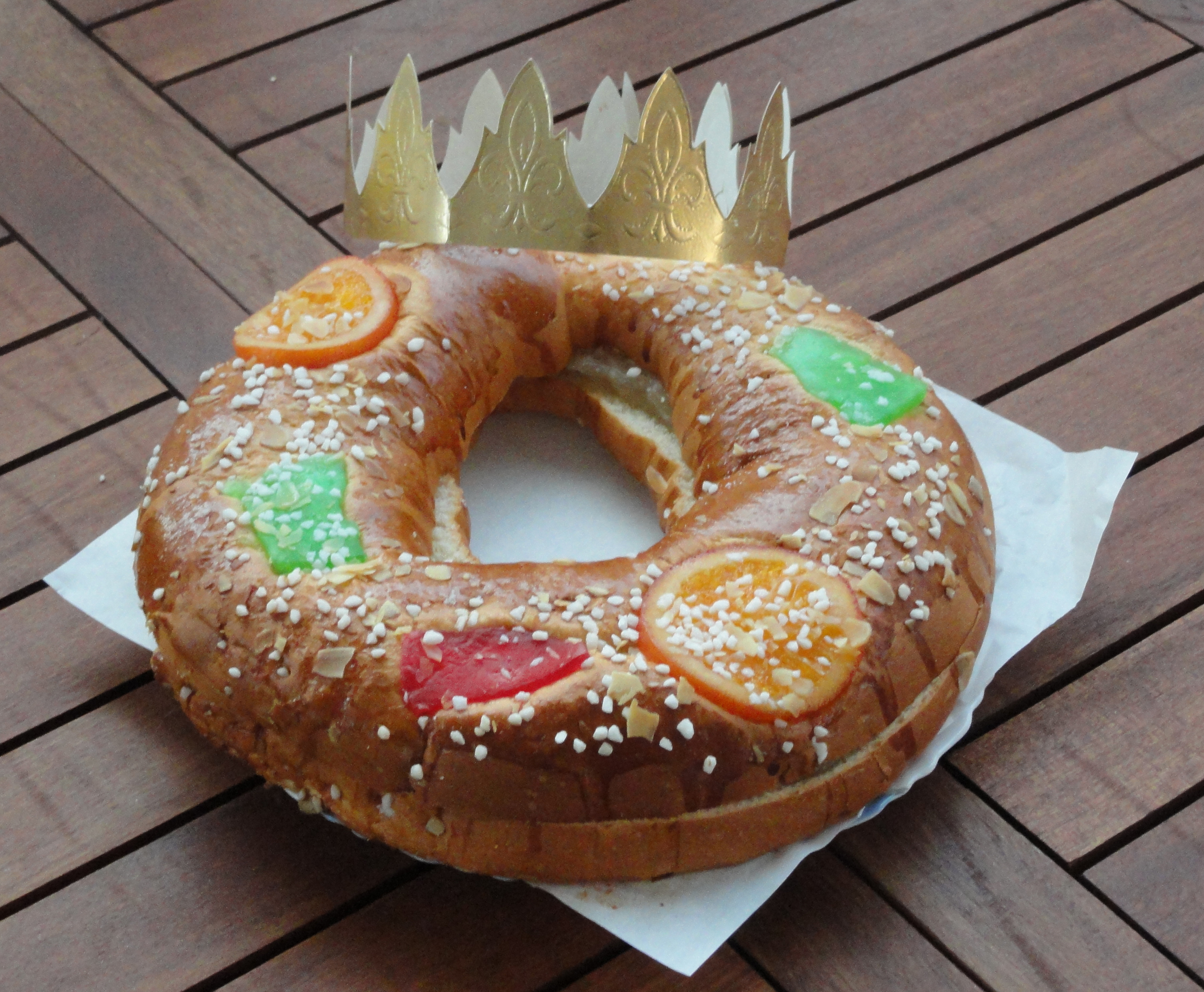
Traditional plain roscón de reyes

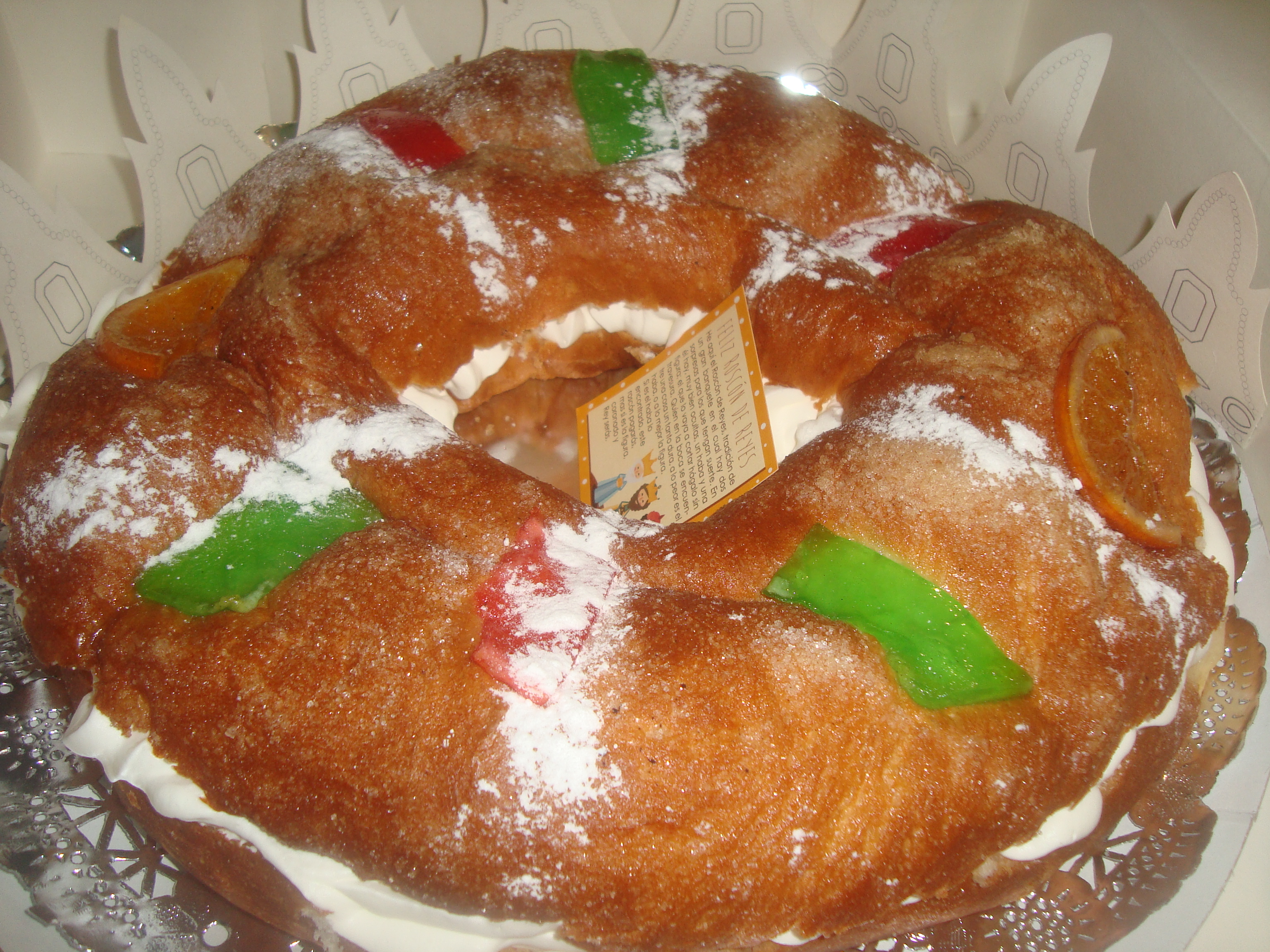
A roscón de reyes from Castellón with whipped cream

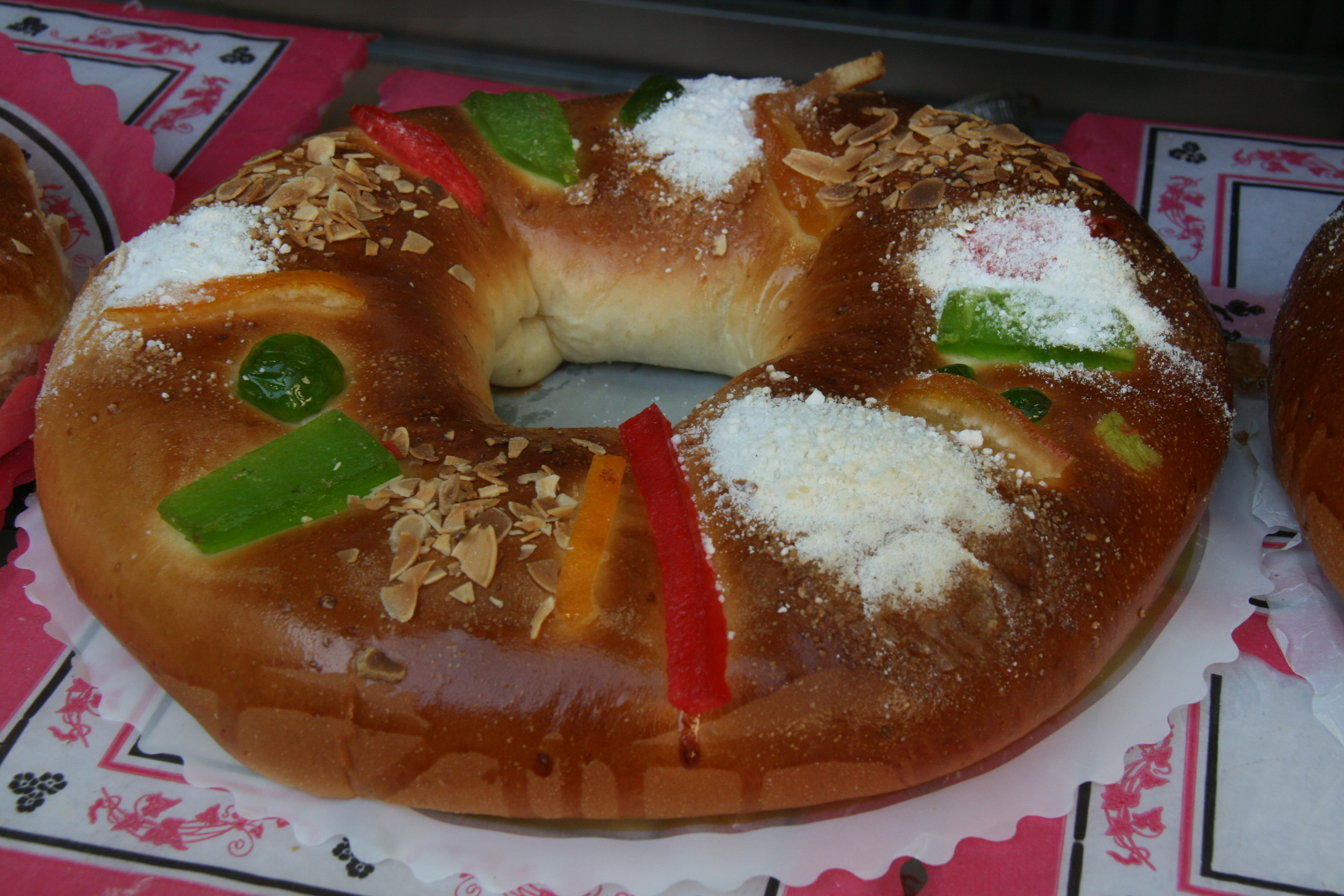
Roscón

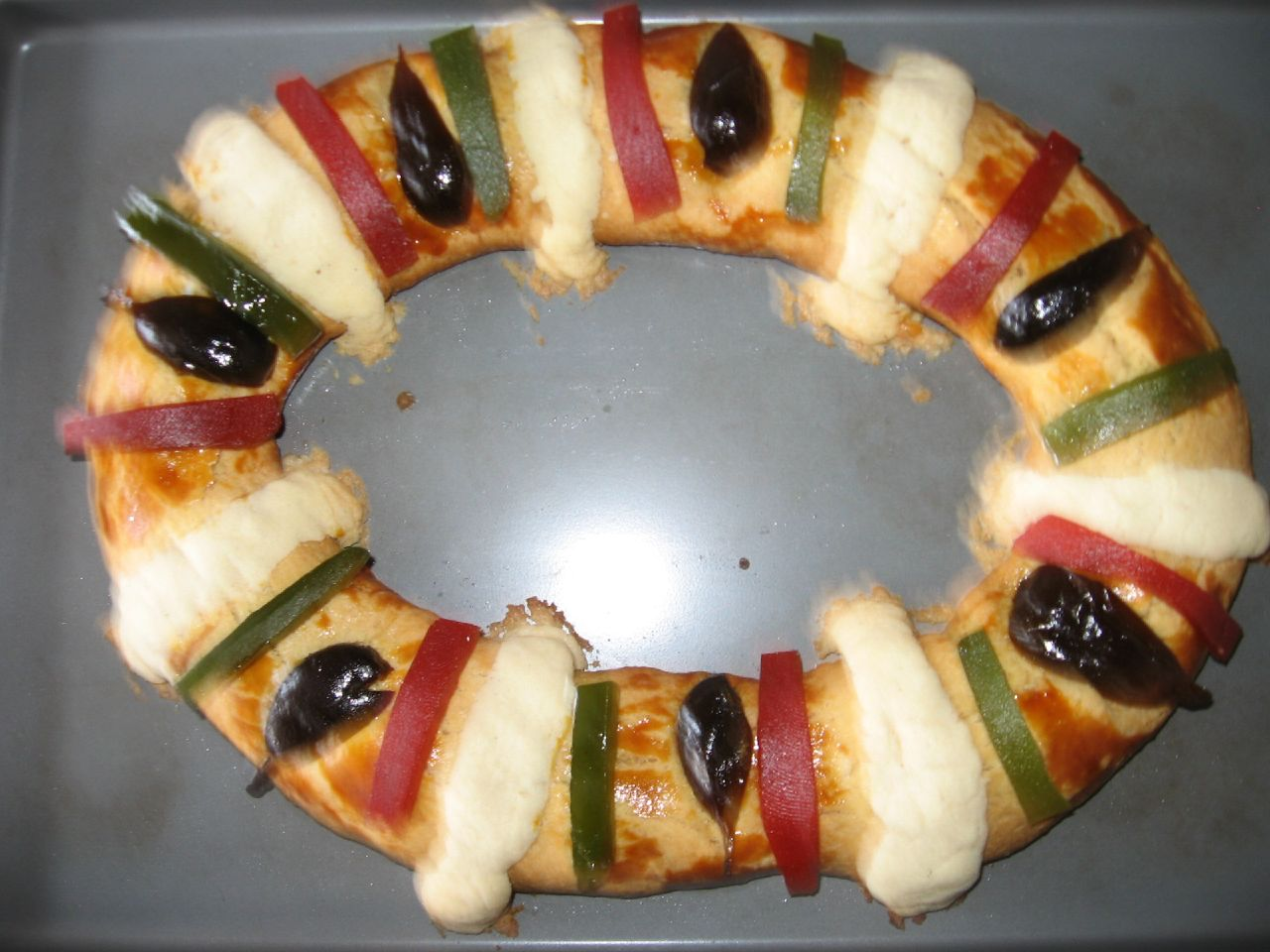
Mexican Rosca de reyes

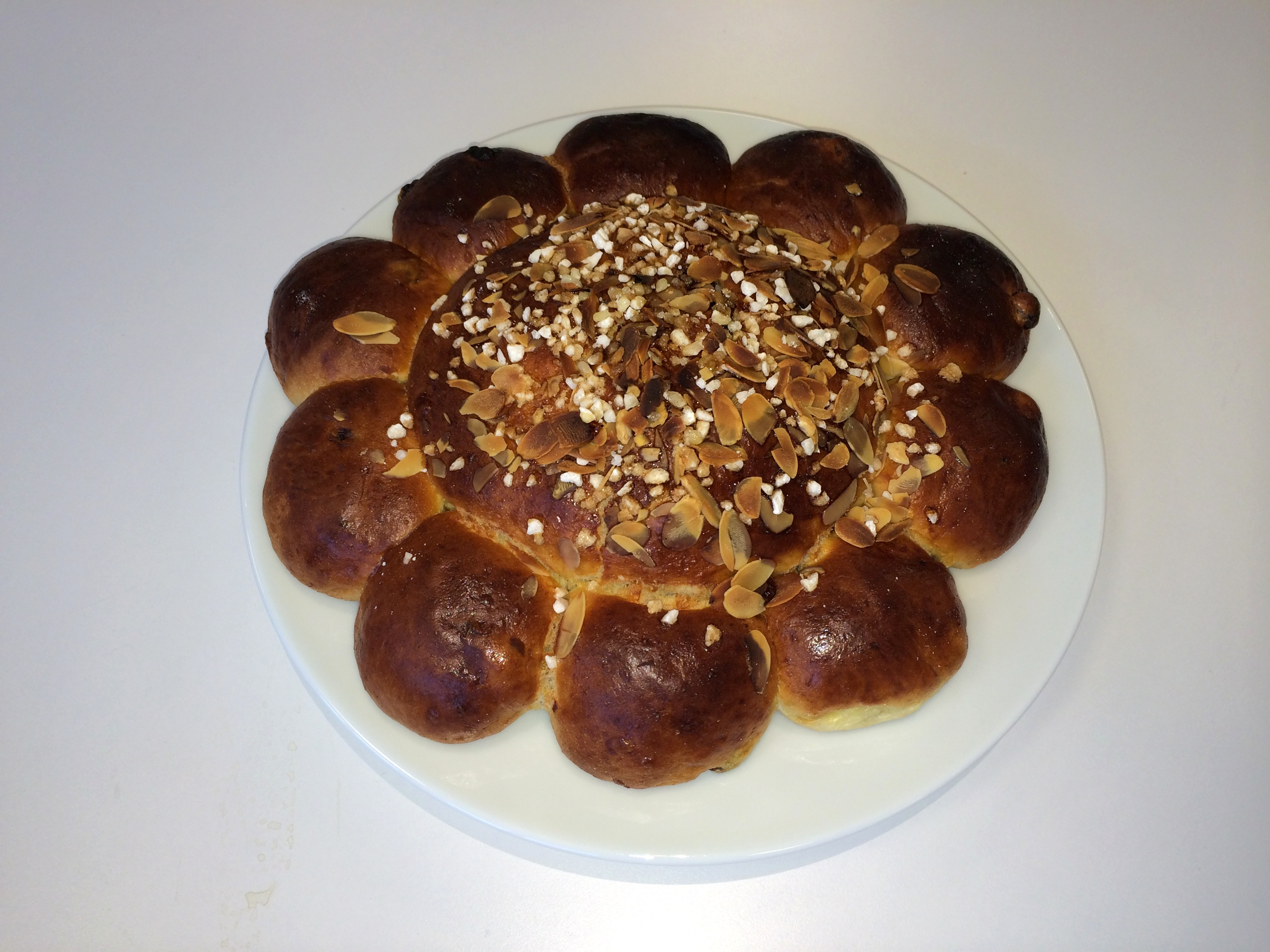
Dreikönigskuchen in Switzerland

== See also ==
- Barmbrack – a bread associated with Hallowe'en in Ireland, where an item (often a ring) is placed inside the bread, with the person who receives it considered fortunate.
- Black bun – a Scottish fruit cake covered with pastry, originally eaten on Twelfth Night but now enjoyed at Hogmanay.
- Bean-feast
- Bread in Spain
- Ensaïmada
- Panettone – an Italian sweet bread served during the Christmas period.

== Bibliography ==
- 1991. Tradiciones Mexicanas. Pg 22, 31. Mexico, D.F., Ed. Diana S.A. de C.V., ISBN 968-13-2203-7
- 1998. Fiestas de México. Pg. 76, Mexico, D.F., Panorama Editorial S.A. de C.V, ISBN 968-38-0048-3
- Christmas Trivia edited by Jennie Miller Helderman, Mary Caulkins. Gramercy, 2002
- Marix-Evans, Martin. The Twelve Days of Christmas. Peter Pauper Press, 2002
- Bowler, Gerry. The World Encyclopedia of Christmas. McClelland & Stewart, 2004
- Collins, Ace. Stories Behind the Great Traditions of Christmas. Zondervan, 2003
