= Vasilopita =

New Year's Day bread or cake

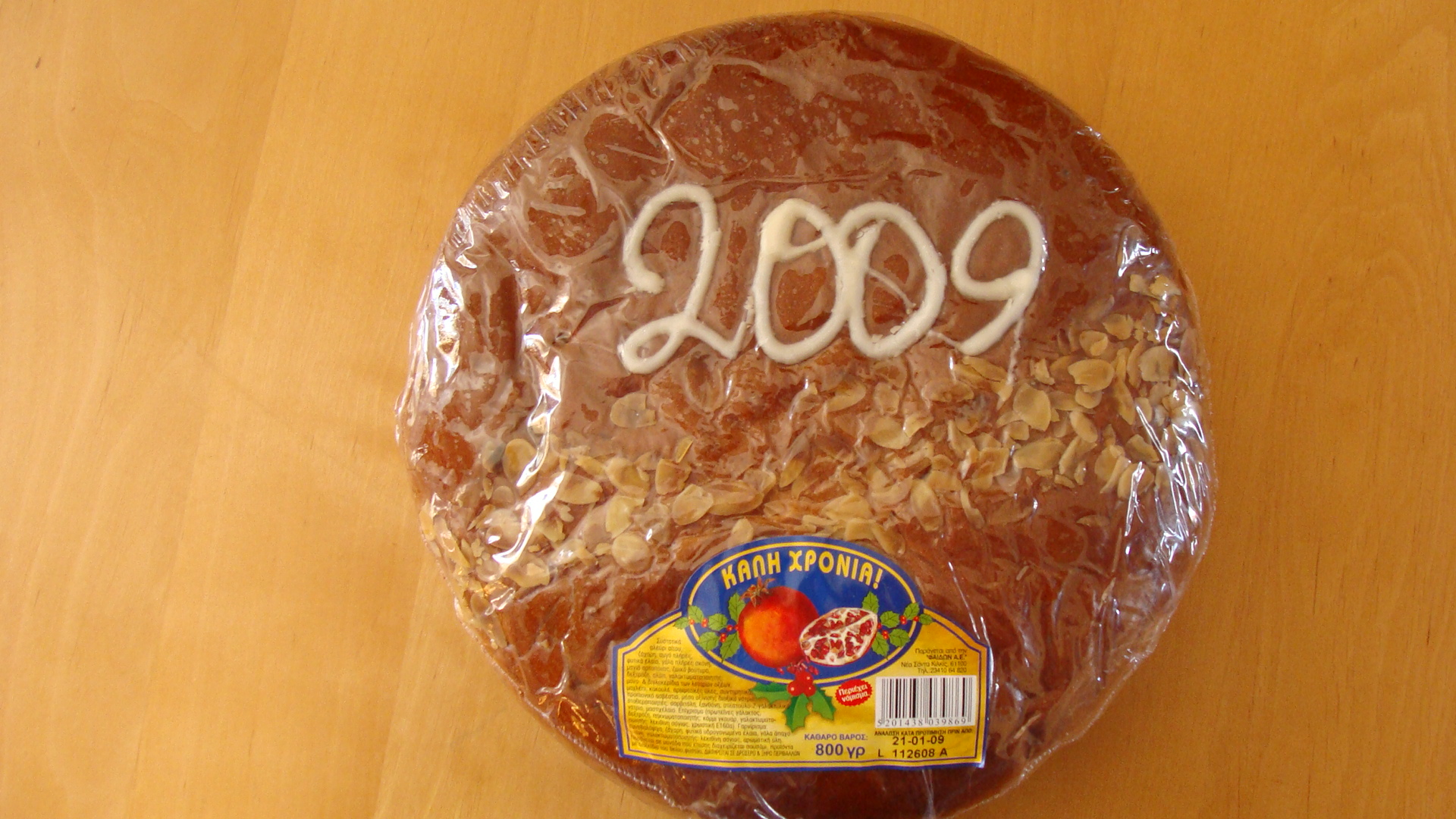
- Type: Bread or cake
- Place of origin: Greece or Cyprus

Vasilopita (Greek: Βασιλόπιτα, Vasilópita, lit. '(St.) Basil-pie' or 'Vassilis pie', see below) is a New Year's Day bread, cake or pie in Greece and throughout Southeastern Europe which contains a hidden coin or trinket which gives good luck to the receiver, like the Western European king cake. It is associated with Saint Basil's day, 1 January, in most of Greece, but in some regions, the traditions surrounding a cake or pita with a hidden coin are attached to Epiphany or to Christmas. It is made of a variety of dough, depending on regional and family tradition, including tsoureki. In some families, instead of dough, it is made from a custard base called galatopita (literally milk-pita). In the Thessaly region a pork filled phyllo pie is made with a hidden coin. The pie is also known as Chronópita (Χρονόπιτα < χρόνος: chrónos ⇨ time/year + πίτα: píta ⇨ pie), meaning "New Year's pie".

In other areas of the Balkans, the tradition of cake with a hidden coin during winter holidays exists, but is not associated with Saint Basil at all. The practice is documented among Ukrainians (a pirog is cut); Romanians; Serbs ("česnica", eaten on Christmas); Albanians ("pite" or “kulaç”, eaten by both Christians and Muslims); Bulgarians (pogacha, Novogodishna banitsa (for New Year's), Svety Vasileva pogacha); etc.

== Ritual ==
On New Year's Day families cut the vasilopita to bless the house and bring good luck for the new year. This is usually done at the midnight of New Year's Eve. A coin is hidden in the bread by slipping it into the dough before baking. At midnight the sign of the cross is etched with a knife across the cake. A piece of cake is sliced for each member of the family and any visitors present at the time, by order of age from eldest to youngest. Slices are also cut for various symbolic people or groups, depending on local and family tradition. They may include the Lord, St. Basil and other saints, the poor, the household, or the Kallikantzaroi. In older times, the coin often was a valuable one, such as a gold sovereign. Nowadays there is often a prearranged gift, money, or otherwise, to be given to the coin recipient.

Many private or public institutions, such as societies, clubs, workplaces, companies, etc., cut their vasilopita at a convenient time between New Year's Day and the beginning of the Great Fast, in celebrations that range from impromptu potluck gatherings to formal receptions or balls.

Saint Basil's Feast Day is observed on 1 January, the beginning of the New Year and the Epiphany season known as the Vasilopita Observance.

== Origins ==
Margaret Hasluck (1927) disputes the historicity of the Greek folk tradition of celebrating the feast day of St. Basil with vasilopita. She says the popular belief is based on a "false etymology". Hasluck arrives at this conclusion by comparing the traditions of Greek-speaking communities with the western European celebrations of the Twelfth Night and Epiphany. Hasluck notes that no document mentions the basilopita, although Gregory of Nyssa confirms the festival of Basil was one of the feast days that succeeded Christmas in his time:

After [Christmas] the spiritual dance was opened by apostles and prophets...These are Stephen, Peter, James, John, and Paul. Then after them, in his due order, the pastor and teacher initiates our present gathering. Who is this? ... I mean Basil, the man of noble life and speech.

Hasluck speculates that the etymology connecting the tradition to Basil's feast day is erroneous. She proposes that the translation "cake of the king" (from basileus) is as accurate as the translation "cake of basil", a claim that she says is supported by the similarity in customs of the hidden coin and the hidden bean. She refers to Larousse Gastronomique's description of the fève custom referring to the gateau des rois (popularly known as king cake in English) associated in present times with the Christian holiday of Epiphany celebrated on the "Twelfth Night" after Christmas. She disputes the Christian origin of the holiday: "We may safely dismiss the theory of their Christian origin and recognize, with many good authorities, in the Twelve Days the relics of a purely pagan festival." According to Hasluck, the pagan holiday of the Twelve Days is the same as the Roman Saturnalia: "One feature of the Saturnalia was that men drew for a king with a bean, and held high revelry under his leadership for the duration of the festivities", which she says is the same as the Greek festival Kronia: "Consequently, with some confidence we identify the Basil of the basilopita with the basileus, the "king" of Saaturnalia".

Nonetheless, in popular tradition, vasilopita is associated with a legend of Basil of Caesarea. According to one story, Basil called on the Roman citizens of Caesarea to raise a ransom payment to stop the siege of the city. Each member of the city gave whatever they had in gold and jewelry. When the ransom was raised, the enemy was so embarrassed by the act of collective giving that he called off the siege without collecting payment. Basil was then tasked with returning the unpaid ransom, but had no way to know which items belonged to which family so he baked all of the jewellery into loaves of bread and distributed the loaves to the city, and by a miracle each citizen received their exact share. In some tellings, the sieging tribal chief is replaced with an evil emperor levying a tax or simply with Basil attempting to give charity to the poor without embarrassing them.

== Name ==
The name "βασιλόπιτα" comes from βασιλεύς 'king' + πίτα 'cake', but was reinterpreted as "Basil's (Βασίλειος) cake". In Cyprus it is also known as vasilopoulla ("βασιλοπούλλα").

== See also ==
- King cake
