= Tsoureki =

Sweet holiday bread

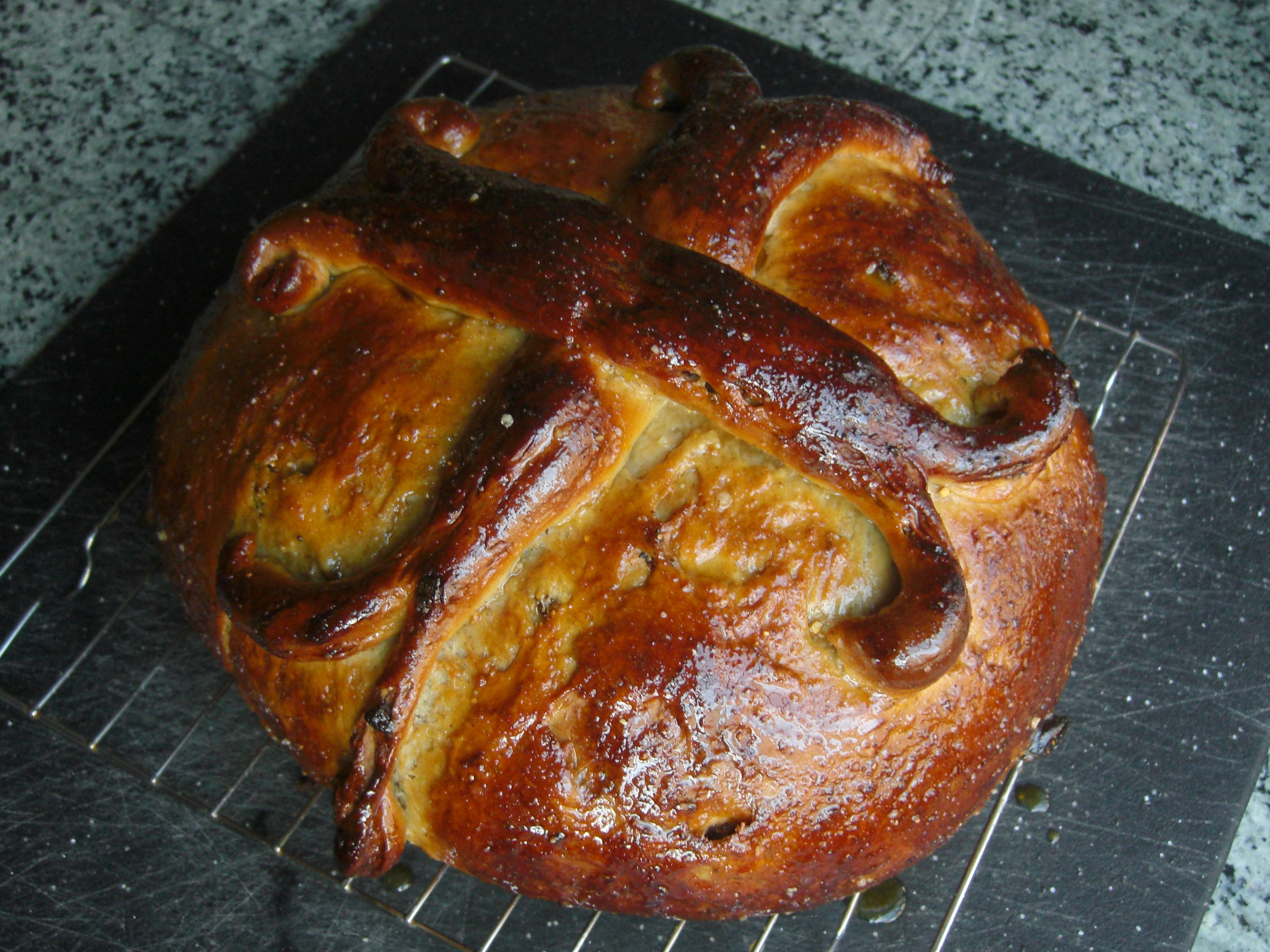
- Christopsomo Christmas bread
- Alternative names: Katʿnahuncʿ or Bsatir
- Type: Sweet bread
- Region or state: Balkans, Anatolia, Middle east
- Variations: Savoury versions

Tsoureki (Greek: τσουρέκι), also known as bsatir, čʿorek, or katʿnahuncʿ (Armenian: պսադիր, չորեկ, կաթնահունց); çyrek (Albanian); kozunak (Bulgarian: козунак); cozonac (Romanian); paskalya çöreği (Turkish); or šurēk (Hijazi Arabic: شُريك), is a sweet holiday bread made with flour, milk, butter, eggs, and sugar. It is commonly seasoned with lemon and orange zest, mastic resin, or mahleb.

Lampropsomo, a variation of tsoureki commonly called "Greek Easter bread", is made by Greeks during Easter in Greece, and the Greek diaspora. It is also called "Armenian Easter bread", and eaten during Easter in Armenia, and the Armenian diaspora.

== Etymology ==
The ancient Armenian name was "bsatir - պսադիր" ("bsag պսակ" - "crown" and "tir դիր", is the root of "tnel դնել" verb: "to put"). This Armenian name is in allusion to Christ’s crown of thorns. The Greek word tsoureki is derived from the Turkish word çörek, meaning "round bread" in Old Turkic. Some dictionaries claim that this is derived from the Old Turkish root çevir- 'turn' or 'to make it round'.

== Greek tradition ==
There are different variations of the Greek tsoureki holiday breads including a round Christmas loaf with a cross decoration called Christopsomo, a braided Easter bread with whole dyed eggs pressed into the dough called lampropsomo, and a loaf with a coin hidden inside for good luck called vasilopita that is baked for St. Basil's Day (New Year's Day).

== Easter bread ==
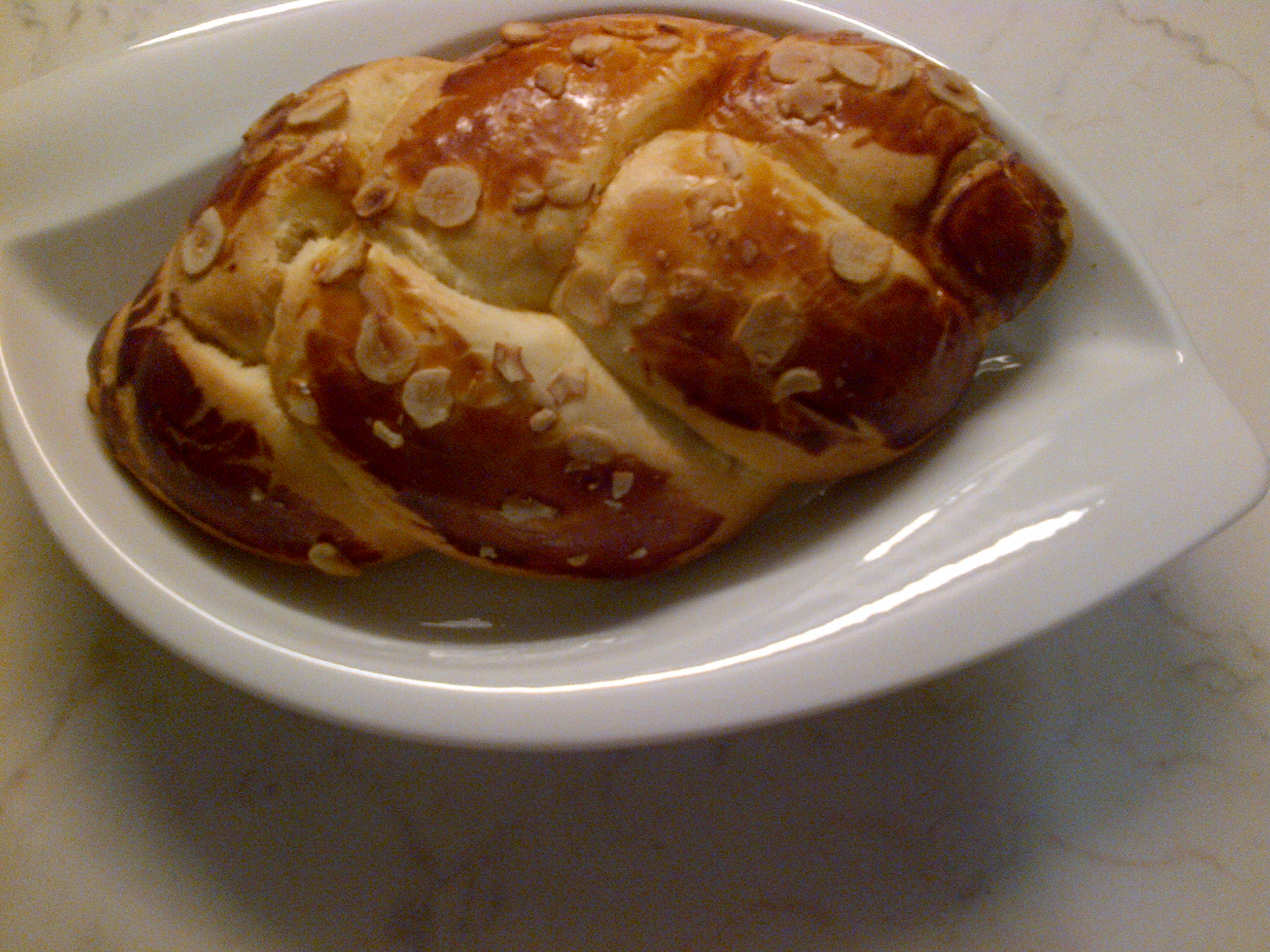
Braided Easter bread garnished with slivered hazelnuts

This bread is sometimes called "Armenian Easter bread". In Armenian, the common names include katnahunts (կաթնահունց), bsatir (բսաթիր), choreg (չորեկ), or cheoreg (չէօրէկ). Before baking choreg, the surface is painted with egg yolk, and the heat of the oven browns it until it acquires a reddish-brown tone that represents the blood of Christ. Traditional Armenian katnahunts omits the dyed Easter eggs, as they are instead used in the Surb Zatik egg fight, another Armenian easter tradition. Armenian katanhunts is made from a yeast-based dough of flour, sugar, milk, butter, eggs, orange/lemon zest and it is often flavored with spices like mahleb, cardamom, cinnamon, nutmeg and vanilla. After rising, the dough is shaped into braids, twists, or loaves and can be filled with sweet additions such as dried fruits (mostly plums, raisins, berries, or apricots), chocolate, or nuts. Brushed with egg yolk, sprinkled with sesame and baked until golden, the result is a soft, slightly sweet bread with spices and optionally, a filling.

Tsoureki is made for Easter in Greece and among the Greek diaspora. It is made from a sweet yeast dough of flour, sugar, eggs, butter and milk, with dyed red Easter eggs pressed into the dough. The dough is brushed with egg wash before baking, and sometimes flavored with mahlep, mastic resin or orange zest. Other flavorings might include almond extract, cinnamon, raisins or fennel seed.

Its Turkish name is paskalya çöreği 'Easter çörek' and It is a bread popular amongst Turkish christians. It does not include whole eggs pressed into the dough as decoration. Some recipes substitute a neutral-flavored oil, such as sunflower oil, and margarine in place of milk and butter. The dough may be seasoned with orange zest, vanilla, mahlep and slivered almonds.

Sometimes tsoureki is used as a gift for special occasion; for instance, it can be given as an Easter gift from children to their godparents.

== Christmas bread ==
Christopsomo (Χριστόψωμο), which translates as "Christ's bread", is a traditional Greek holiday bread that is sometimes decorated with whole walnuts, sesame seeds and slivered almonds. Also called Christmas fruit bread, the tsoureki dough may include a combination of raisins, dried apricots, dried figs, orange zest, cinnamon, allspice, cloves, cardamom, Mastic (plant resin) and mahleb. (Some recipes suggest marinating the raisins and dried figs overnight in wines like retsina or mavrodaphne). Some of the dough is set aside for the loaf's cross-shaped decoration.

The bread may be glazed with a syrup made from honey, orange juice, and slivered almonds.

== See also ==
- Bağaça
- Brioche
- Cardamom bread
- Challah
- Cozonac, the Romanian and Bulgarian variant
- Kulich (bread)
- List of foods with religious symbolism
- Nut roll
- Pulla
- Vánočka
- Zopf
