= List of sweet breads =

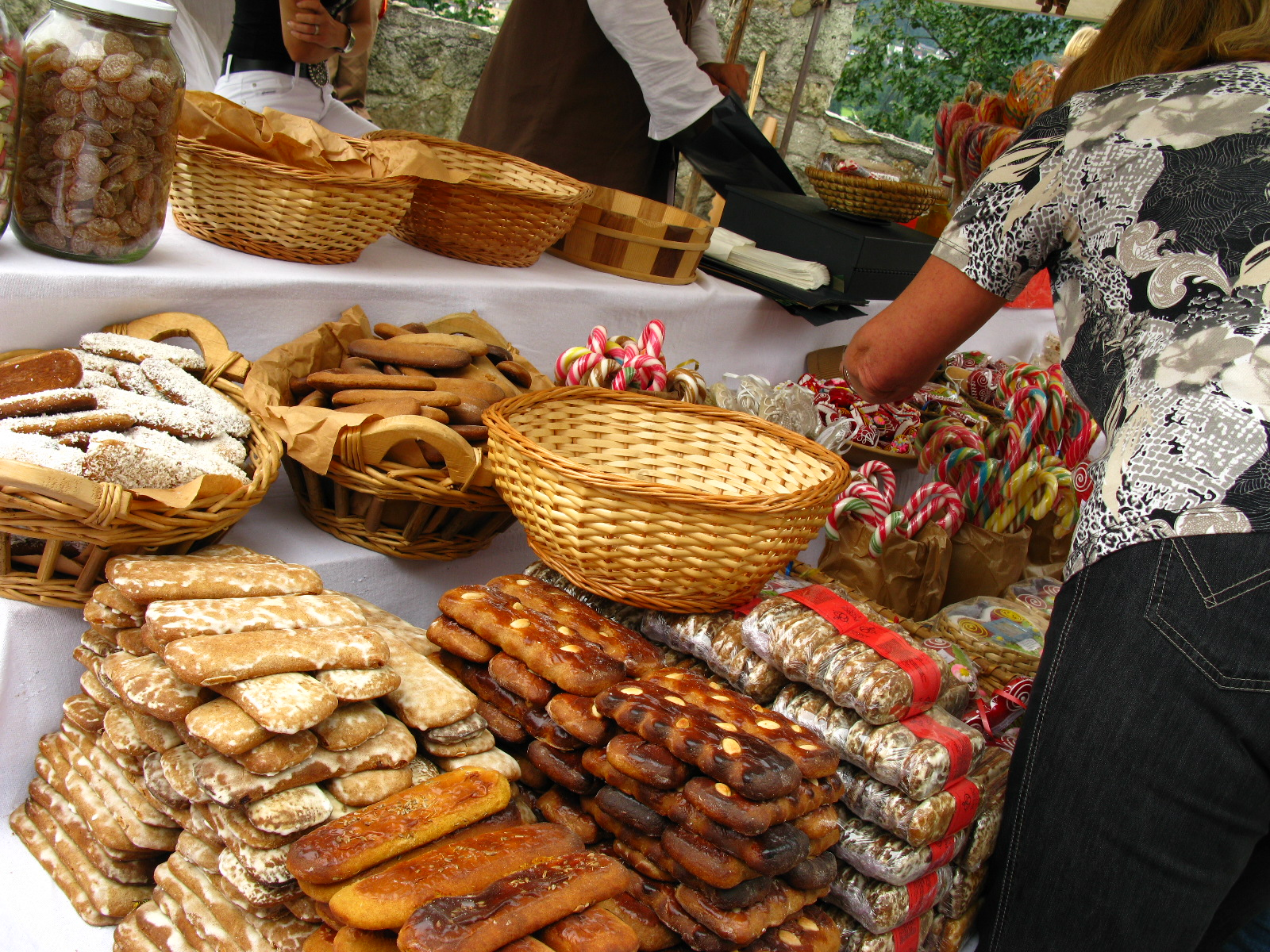
Various sweet breads at a "medieval day" event at Velenje Castle, Velenje, Slovenia

This is a list of sweet breads. Sweet bread, also referred to as pan dulce, buns, or coffee bread, is a bread or cake that is typically sweet in flavor. Some sweet breads, such as Portuguese pão doce, may be prepared with potato flour, which imparts a sweet flavor and light texture to them. Some sweet breads that originated as cake-breads, such as lardy cake, Bath buns, and Chelsea buns, are classified as sweet breads in contemporary culinary taxonomy, even though some still have the word "cake" in them.

== Sweet breads ==
=== A ===
- Amish friendship bread – Bread or cake made from a shared sourdough starter
- Aniseed – Species of flowering plant bread
- Anpan – Japanese filled sweet bun
- Apple bread – Taiwanese aromatic bread

=== B ===
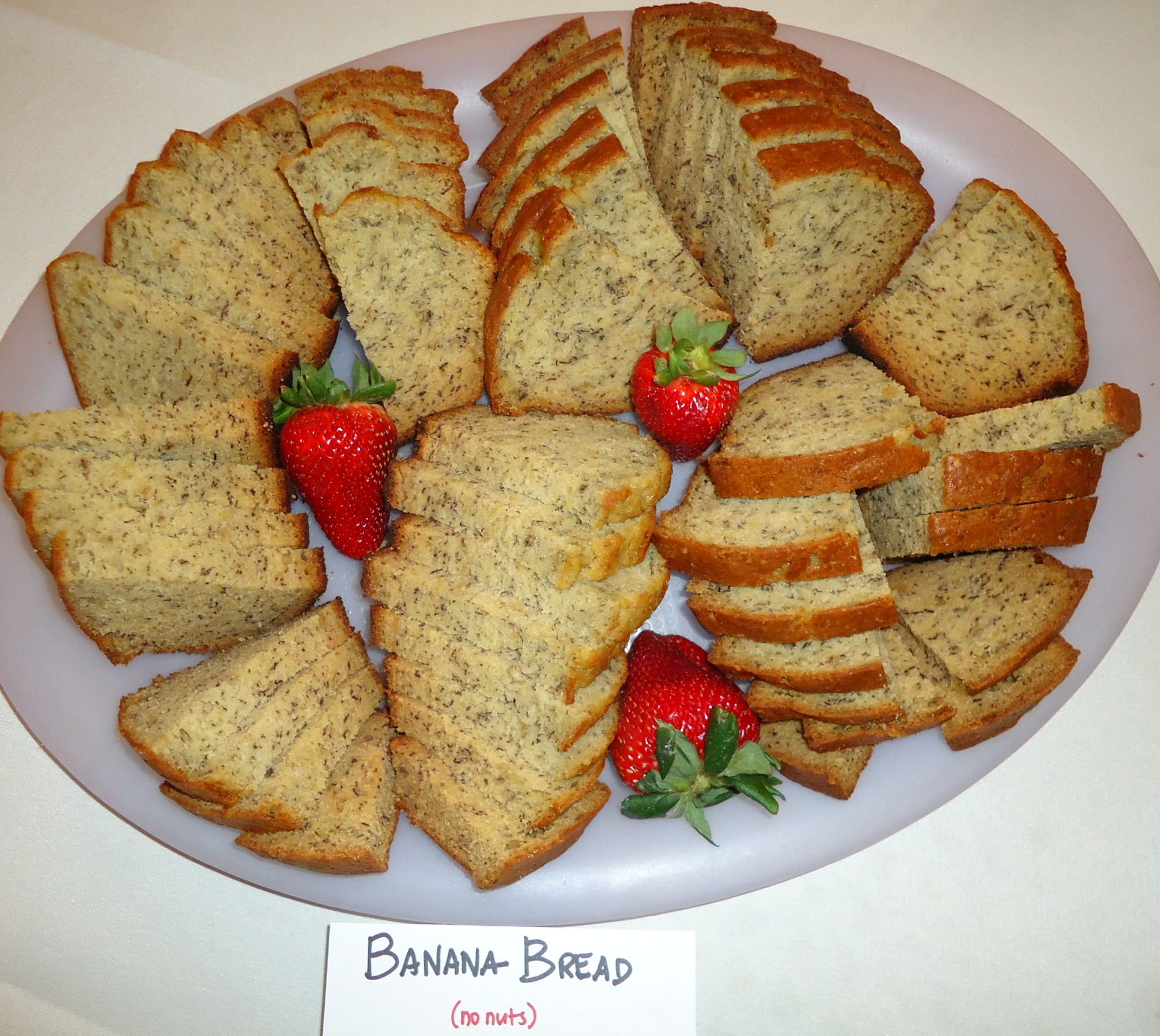
Banana bread with strawberries

- Babka – Eastern European sweet yeast viennoiserie cake or bread
- Banana bread – Cake made from mashed bananas
- Banbury cake – Spiced, oval-shaped, currant-filled pastry
- Bara brith – Welsh tea bread
- Barmbrack – Irish bread with sultanas and raisins
- Bath bun – Sweet bun topped with crushed sugar
- Belgian bun – Sweet bun with sultanas, topped with icing and half a glace cherry
- Bienenstich – German layered yeast cake
- Bisciola – Italian sweet bread
- Boston bun – Sweet roll with spices and thick icing
- Bremer Klaben – German type of dried fruit filled bread
- Brioche – Type of French viennoiserie
- Bublik – Ring-shaped bread roll
- Buccellato (di Lucca) – Italian sweet bread
- Bun – Bread-based food

=== C ===
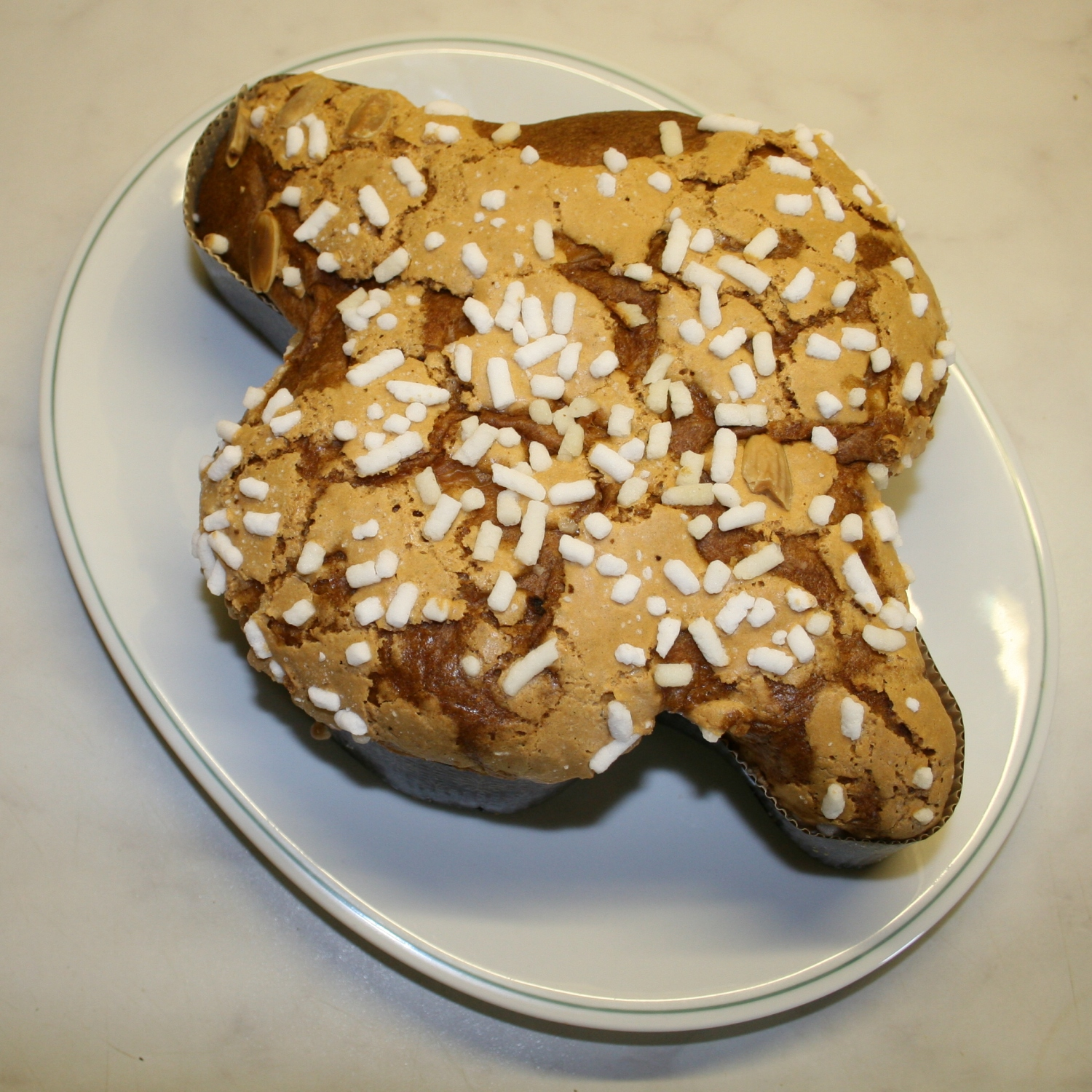
Colomba di Pasqua

- Cardamom bread – Bread flavored with cardamom
- Cemita – Sandwich from Puebla City, in México
- Challah – Jewish honey egg bread
- Chelsea bun – English type of spiced bun
- Cinnamon roll – Sweet roll flavoured with cinnamon
- Cocktail bun – Sweet bun with coconut
- Cornbread - American sweet, salty cake made from cornmeal.
- Coffee cake, a sweet bread intended to be eaten with coffee
- Colomba di Pasqua – Italian traditional Easter cake
- Colston bun – Sweet bun with dried fruit and spices
- Concha (bread) – Mexican sweet bun
- Corone (bread) – Japanese sweet bread
- Cougnou – Bread baked during Christmas time
- Couque suisse – Belgian sweet pastry
- Cozonac – Sweet leavened bread, traditional to Bulgaria and Romania
- Currant bun – Form of sweetened bread

=== D ===
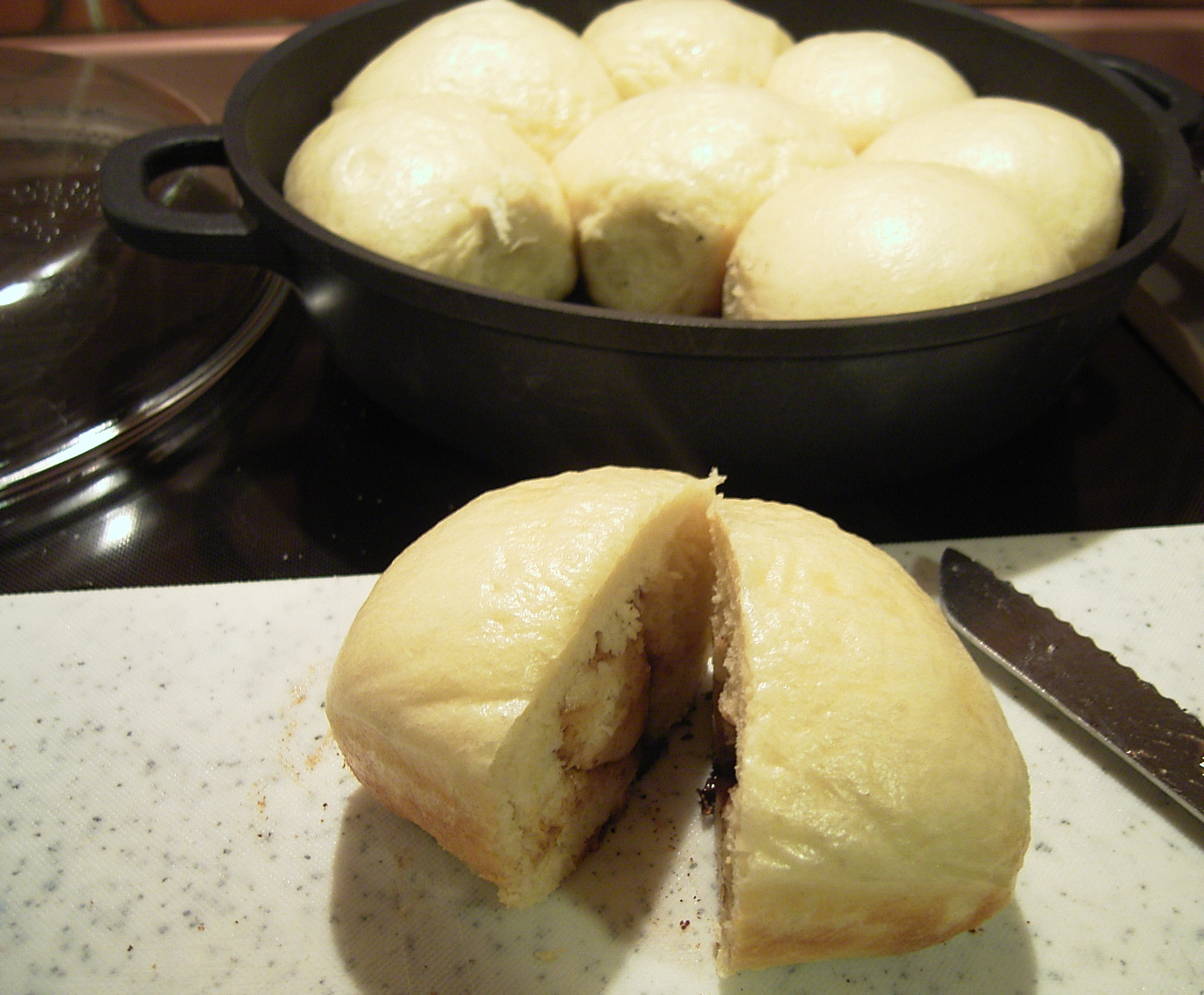
Dampfnudel

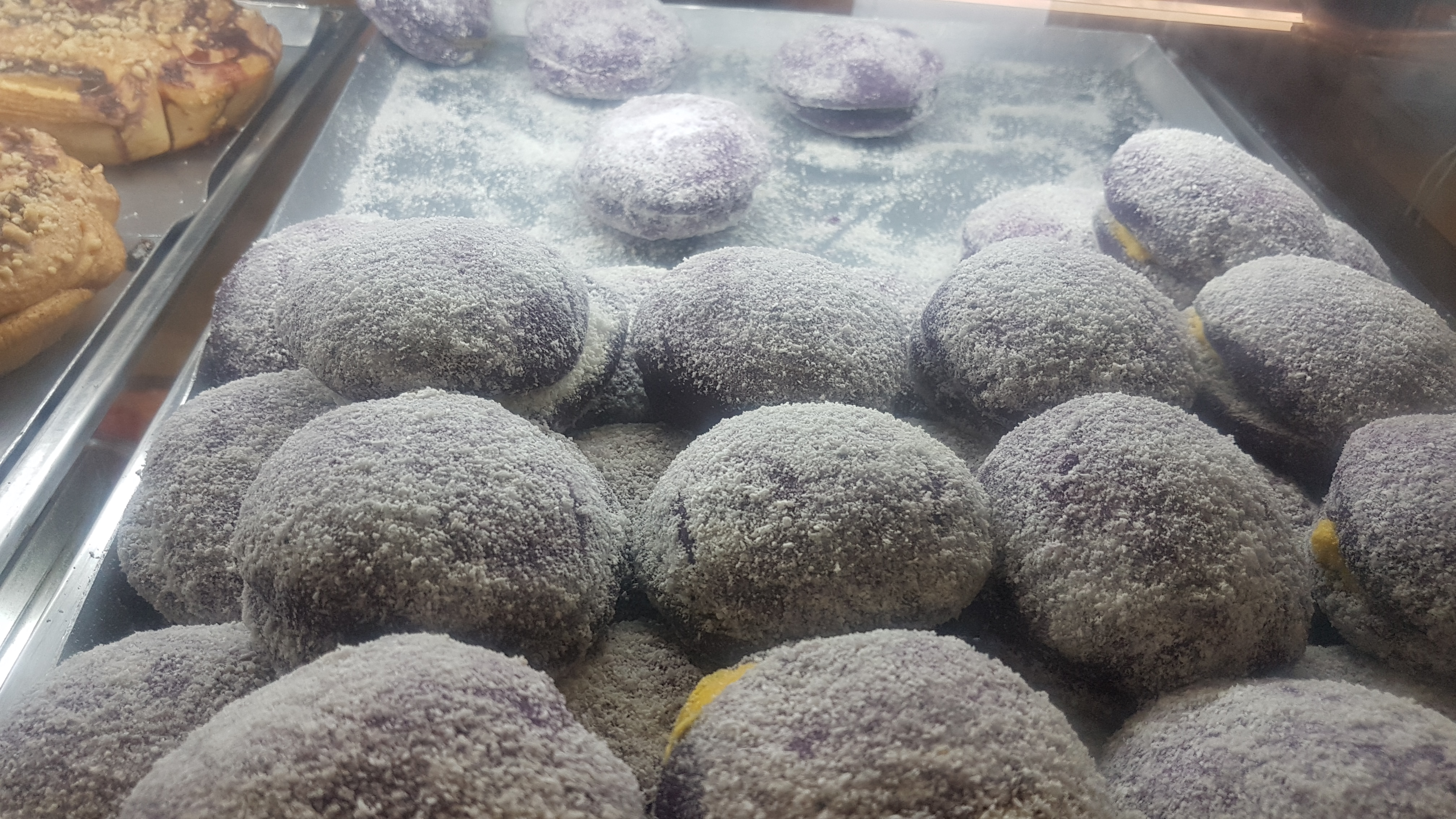
Double buddy

- Dampfnudel – German dumpling
- Danish pastry – Multilayered, laminated sweet pastry – in Denmark, these types of pastries are referred to as wienerbrød
- Double buddy – Philippine bread with desiccated coconut meat
- Dripping cake – British traditional bread

=== E ===
- Egg waffle – Hong Kong dish

=== F ===
- Facturas – Argentine pastries
- Fat Rascal – Traditional cake from Yorkshire
- Fruit bun – Sweet bread with fruit and spices

=== G ===
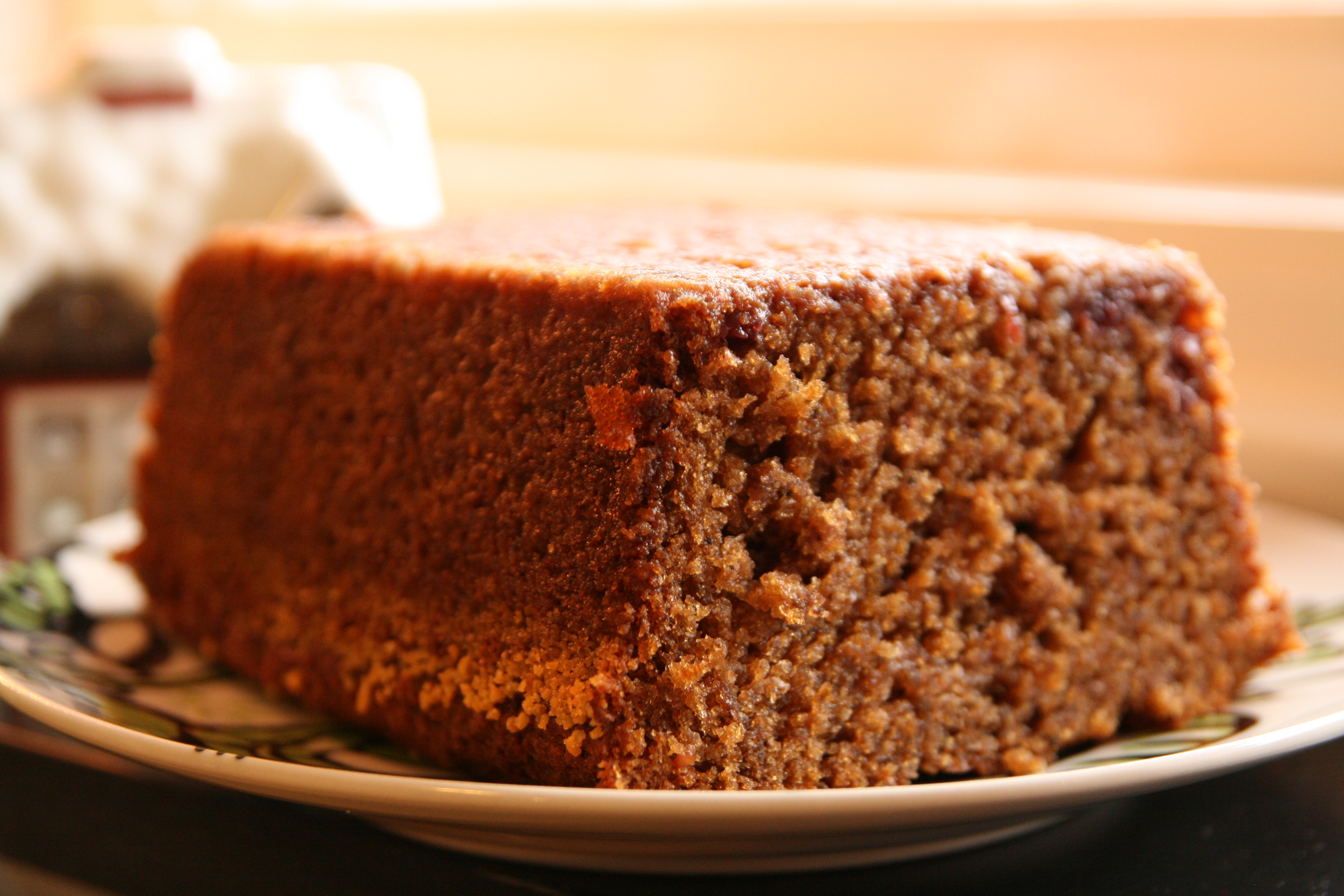
Soft gingerbread with mountain cranberry

- Gata – Armenian sweet bread – Armenian pastry or sweet bread
- Germknödel – German and Austrian yeast dough dumpling
- Gingerbread – Spiced dough used for baking
- Goro – Norwegian biscuit
- Guernsey Gâche – Regional bread of Guernsey
- Gugelhupf – German sweet bread

=== H ===
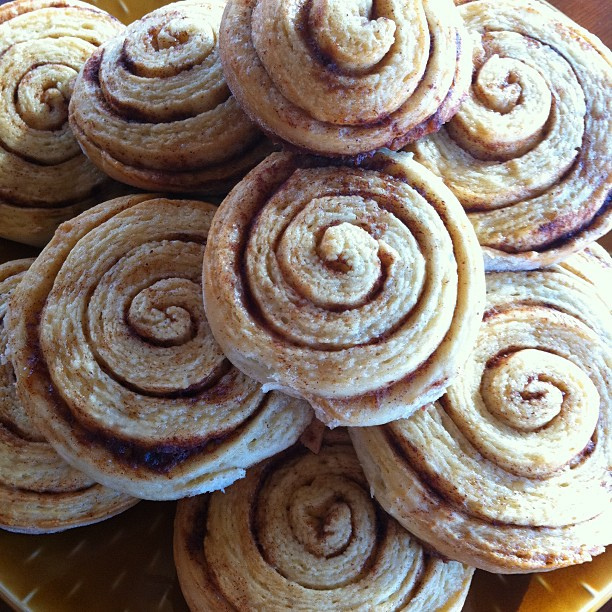
Honey buns prepared with raw honey

- Halguane – Culinary traditions of Circassia
- Hefekranz – Sweet bread from the Germanic region
- Himbasha – Bread native to Ethiopia and Eritrea
- Honey bun – Fried yeast pastry
- Hot cross bun – Baked item for Easter

=== I ===
- Iced bun – Bread bun with a white or pink icing sugar glaze

=== K ===
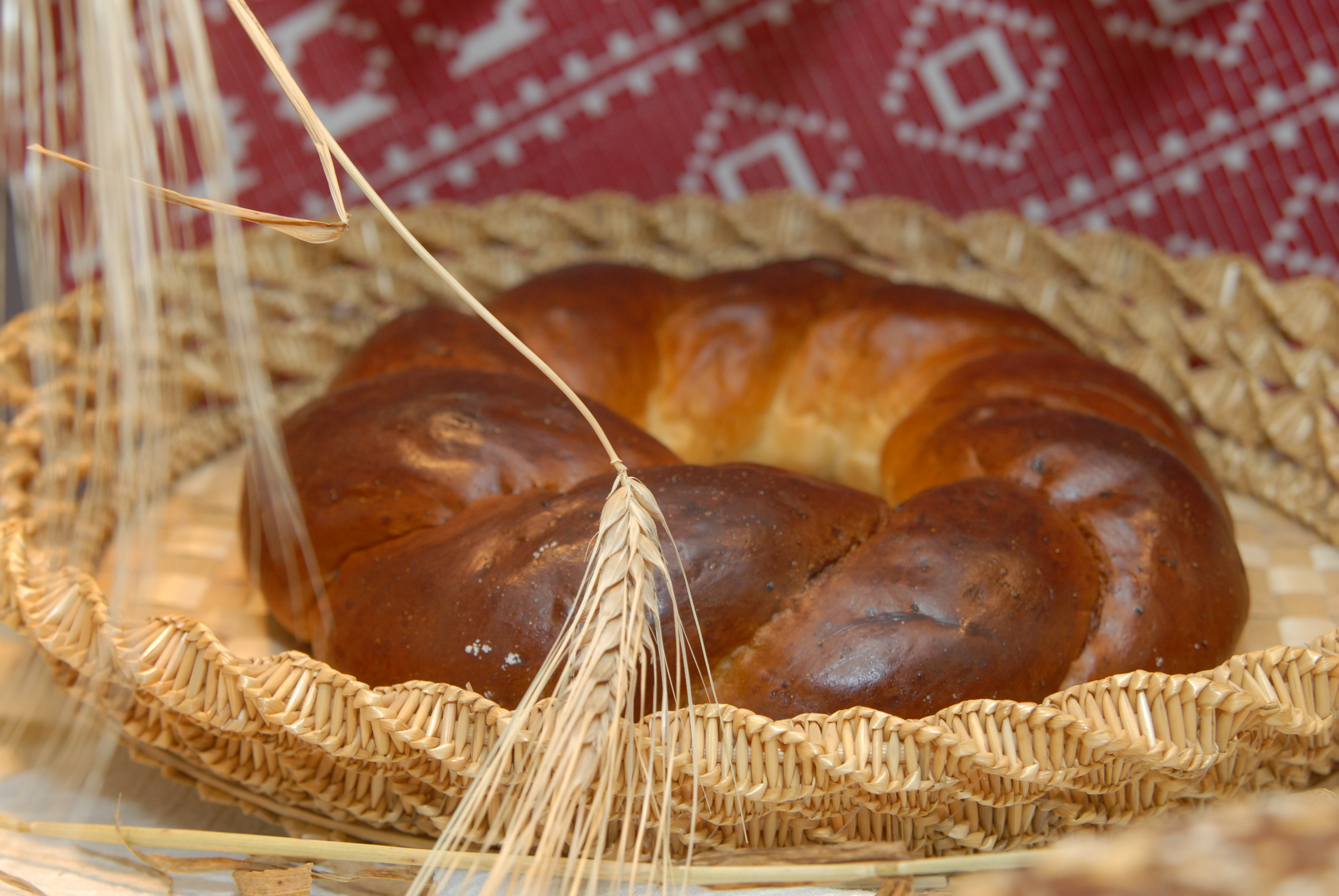
Kalács

- Kalács – Eastern European bread – Hungarian sweet bread
- Kerststol – Christmas bread
- King cake – Type of cake associated with Epiphany
- Kolach – Eastern European bread
- Kołacz – Eastern European bread – dates to the start of the 13th century as a unique bread served at Polish weddings
- Kulich (bread) – Type of Russian Easter bread

=== L ===
- Lardy cake – English form of sweet spiced bread
- Lazarakia – Sweet spice breads made on Lazarus Saturday
- London bun – English sweet bun
- Longevity peach – Type of lotus seed bun
- Lotus seed bun – Chinese sweet bun

=== M ===
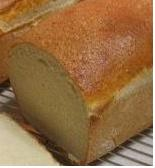
Manchet

- Makówki – Central European dessert
- Manchet – Variety of white bread
- Mantecadas – Spongy sweet bread originating in Spain
- Melonpan – Japanese sweet bread
- Mosbolletjies – South African sweet bread
- Muffin – Part-raised flatbread or quickbread

=== P ===
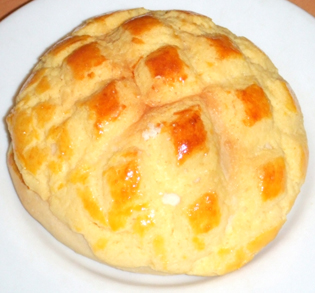
A pineapple bun

- Pain aux raisins – French viennoiserie
- Pain d'épices – French siced cake
- Pan de coco – Philippine sweet bread
- Pan de muerto – Mexican pastry
- Pan de regla – Philippine bread with a red bread pudding filling
- Pan de Pascua – Chilean cake associated with Christmas
- Pan dulce – Generic name for a range of Mexican baked goods
- Pandoro – Italian sweet bread
- Panettone – Italian yeasted cake
- Pão de cará
- Paris buns – Sweetened breadlike cake similar to scones
- Paska – Easter bread native to Russia, Slovakia and Ukraine
- Pastel de Camiguín – Philippine bread with a custard filling
- Peanut butter bun – Chinese sweet baked good
- Penia – Type of sweet Italian bread
- Persian – Fried sweet roll or doughnut with a spiral shape
- Picatostes – Slices of fried bread
- Pineapple bun – Hong Kong sweet bun
- Pizza dolce di Beridde – Italian unleavened sweet bread
- Portuguese sweet bread – Various Portuguese sweet breads
- Potica – Slovenian dessert bread with a filling, traditionally walnut
- Pulla – Bread flavored with cardamom
- Pumpkin bread – Type of moist quick bread made with pumpkin

=== R ===
- Raisin bread – Sweet bread made with raisins and cinnamon
- Rosca de reyes – Type of cake associated with Epiphany – Mexican sweet bread prepared in a crown shape

=== S ===
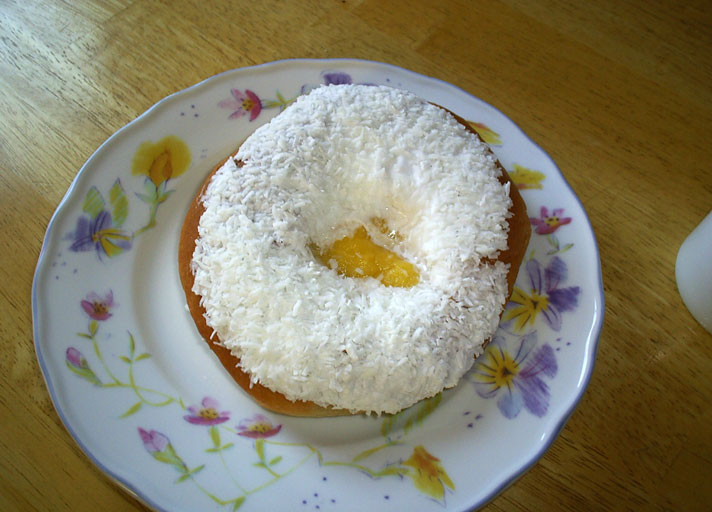
Skolebrød

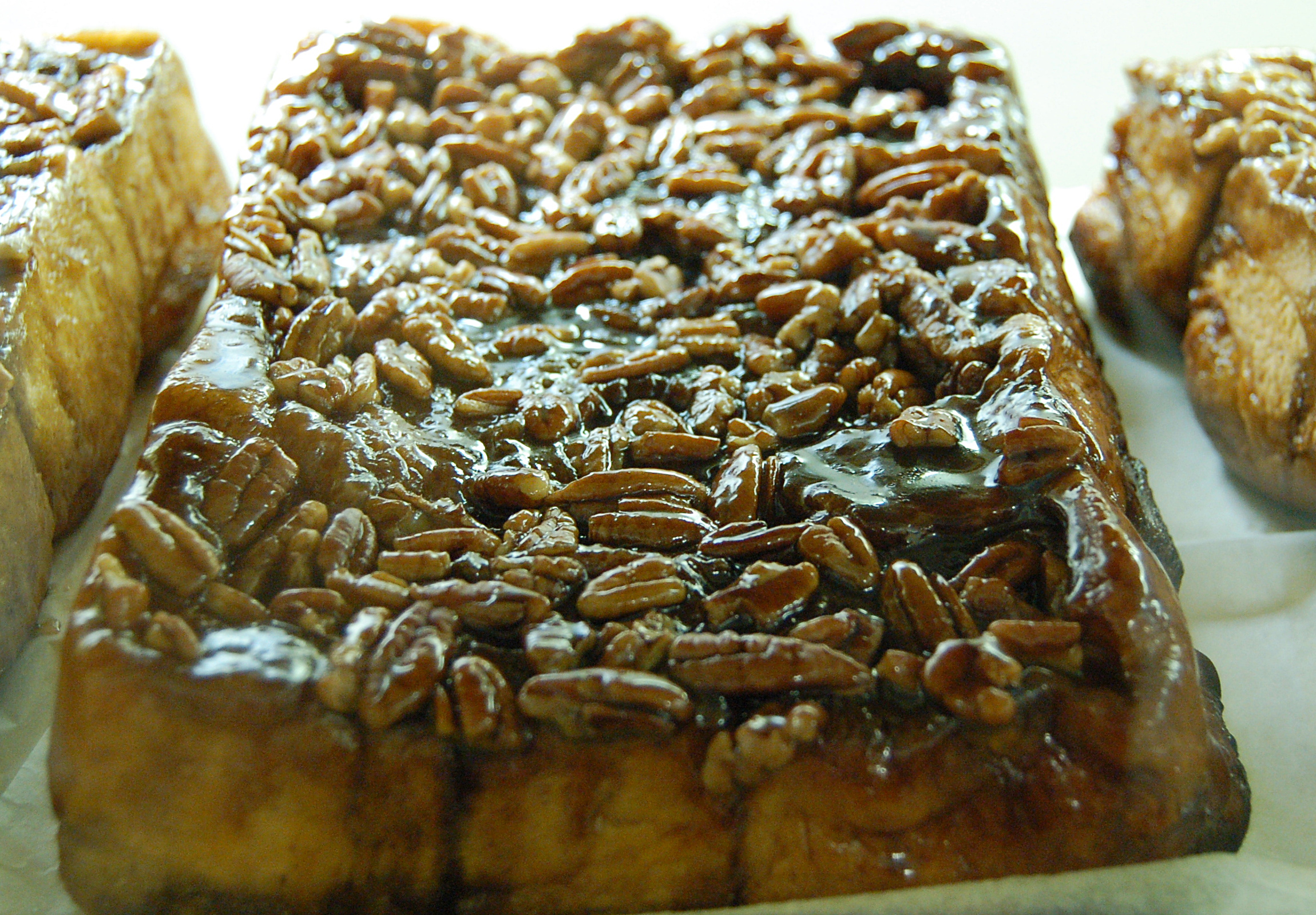
A sticky bun and nut loaf

- Saffron bun – Sweet bun flavoured with saffron
- Sally Lunn bun – English sweet bun
- Scone – Baked goods
- Shortcake – Baked dessert with a crumbly texture
- Singing hinny – Type of bannock, griddle cake or scone
- Skolebrød – Norwegian sweet roll
- Soboro-ppang – Korean streusel bread
- Spanish bread – Philippine bread with a sweet buttery filling
- Sticky bun – Type of dessert or breakfast sweet roll
- Stollen – Christmas bread – originally from Germany and traditionally served at Christmas
- Suikerbrood – Yeast-based bread
- Sushki – Small, crunchy, mildly sweet bread rings
- Sweet roll – Baked yeast-leavened dessert or breakfast

=== T ===
- Tahini roll – Sweet bun with tahini
- Teacake – Dessert item served with tea
- Tsoureki – Sweet holiday bread

=== V ===
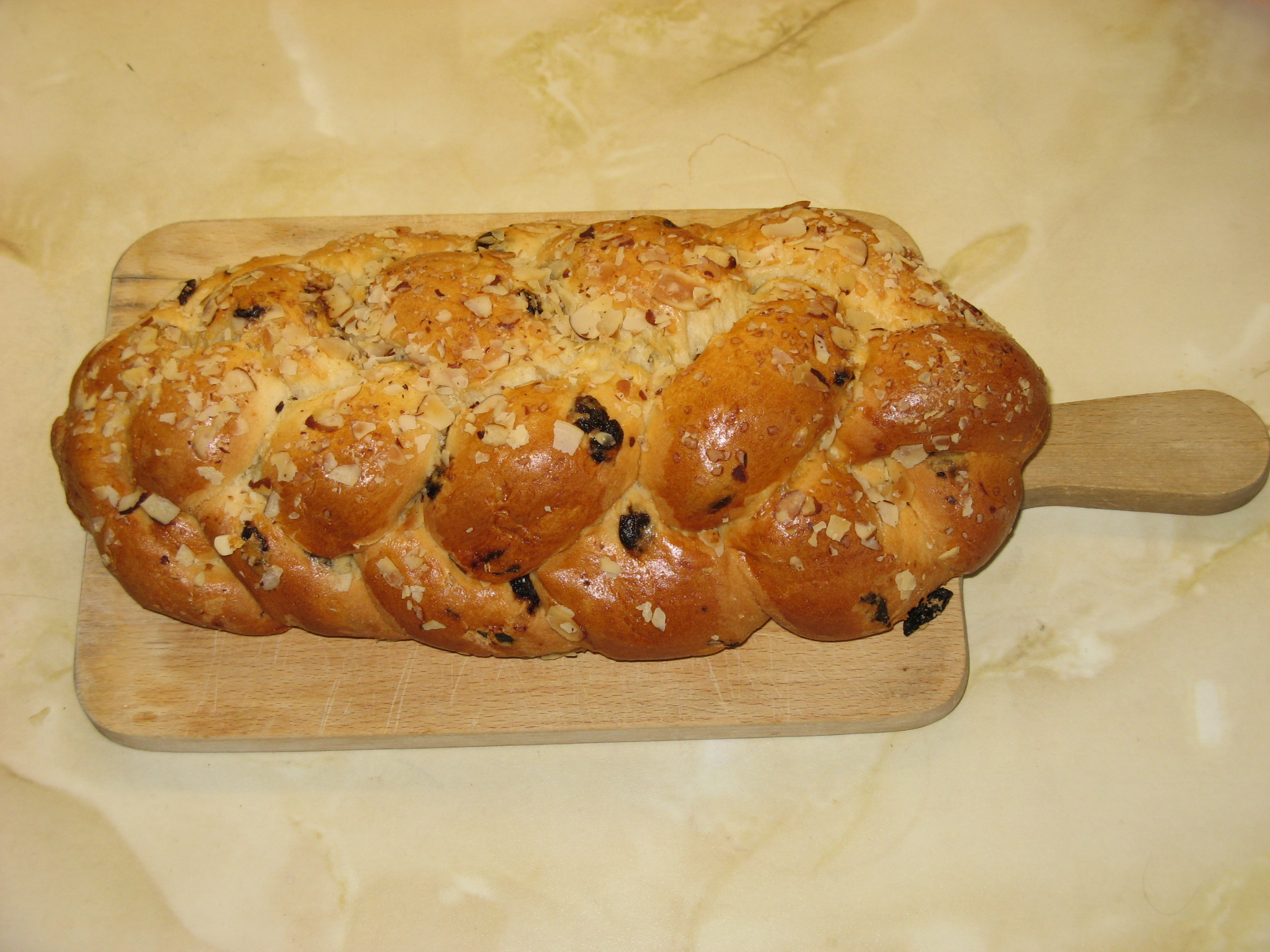
Vánočka

- Vánočka – Czech and Slovak plaited bread
- Velhote – Portuguese sweet bread with sugar and cinnamon
- Viennoiserie – Type of baked goods and dough

=== W ===
- Waffle – Batter- or dough-based food
- Welsh cake – Griddle-cooked sweet cake from Wales

=== Z ===
- Zucchini bread

== See also ==
- List of baked goods
- List of bread rolls
- List of breads
- List of buns
- List of pastries
- List of quick breads
- Lists of prepared foods
- List of toast dishes
- Mexican breads
