= Rock cake =

Small cake resembling a rock

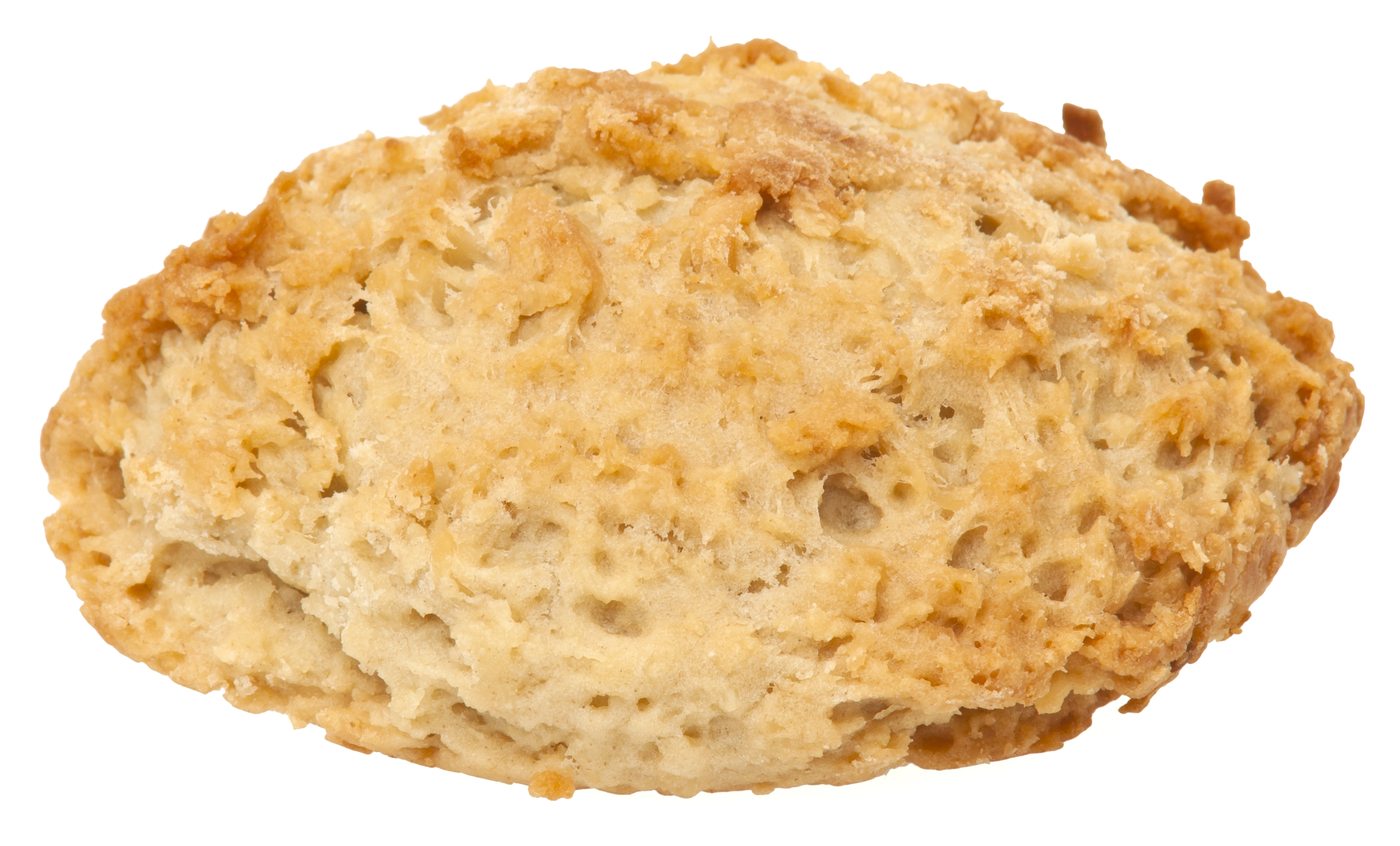
- A rock cake made by Golden Krust bakery
- Alternative names: Rock bun Scone (US)
- Type: pastry
- Place of origin: United Kingdom; Ireland
- Main ingredients: Flour, butter or margarine, sugar, egg, baking powder, water, dried fruit (currants, raisins, candied orange peel), nutmeg and mixed spices
- Food energy (per serving): 166.6 kcal (697 kJ)
Nutritional value
(per serving)
- Protein: 2.5 g
- Fat: 5.6 g
- Carbohydrate: 26.1 g

A rock cake, also called a rock bun, is a small cake with a rough surface resembling a rock. They were promoted by the British Ministry of Food during the Second World War since they required fewer eggs and less sugar than ordinary cakes, important savings in a time of strict rationing. Traditional recipes bulked them with oatmeal, which was more readily available than white flour.

== Recipe ==
Mrs Beeton's widely known 1861 recipe book includes two early recipes for rock biscuits. One calls for flour, butter, 'moist sugar' (muscovado), lemon, milk, and baking powder. The other recipe more closely resembles shortbread, as it uses flour, butter, and currants but no leavening agent.

A typical modern recipe for 12 cakes requires about 8 oz (225 g) of flour, 1 teaspoon of baking powder, 4 oz (110 g) of butter or margarine, 2 oz (55 g) of sugar, 4 oz (110 g) of dried fruit such as raisins, candied orange peel, etc., 2 oz (55g) of currants, 1 beaten egg, 1 to 3 tablespoons of milk and a pinch of nutmeg and mixed spices. Usually, flour and butter are first mixed until the mixture resembles breadcrumbs; then the other ingredients are added to create a stiff dough, which is dropped from a spoon to a baking tray or roughly formed with two forks. The cakes (optionally sprinkled with sugar and cinnamon) are baked for about 15 minutes at 180°C (350°F; Regulo 4), retaining an uneven form and contour.

Instead of dried fruit, chocolate chips/drops can also be used.

Variations include the Jamaican rock cake, which is similar, but usually includes grated coconut, and the traditional British rock cake, which contains oatmeal.

== See also ==
- Scone
- Fat rascal
