= Puftaloon =

Fried scone

A puftaloon is a shallow-fried scone of Australian origin. It is made from flour, fat, salt, a leavening agent, and either water, butter, or milk. The food writer Helen Saberi describes puftaloons as "somewhere between a damper and a scone". Puftaloons can be served with sweet or savoury accompaniments, although they were traditionally eaten with golden syrup or treacle. Other sweet accompaniments include honey, or butter and jam, while savoury options include bacon, gravy, and grilled tomatoes. Puftaloons are also known as fried scones and were historically called moon balls, puff de lunas, and puftaloonies.

One representative recipe, published in the New South Wales newspaper Manilla Express in 1904, called for cooks to use "½ lb. of good self-raising flour, 1½ gills of milk, salt", and:

Sift the flour and salt, make into a moist dough with the milk, turn out on to a floured board; knead slightly and roll out half an inch thick; stamp out small rounds with a cutter, and fry in plenty of hot fat till golden brown, being so light they must be turned. Drain on paper. Serve hot with jam, treacle, honey, or sugar.

Unlike many of the dishes prepared in the colonial period, puftaloons were regarded as acceptable fare in the home and country. Male settlers, away from women who would cook cakes and biscuits, prepared puftaloons as they camped. Puftaloons continued to be eaten through the early 20th century. During the Great Depression of the 1930s when food was scarce, puftaloons were considered a rare treat, eaten with golden syrup known under the nickname "cocky's joy". Puftaloons are still eaten in Australia, where they are regarded as nostalgic. Several restaurants serve them, including sweet versions flavoured with cinnamon and paired with golden syrup and caramelised pineapple, and a savoury version eaten with taramasalata and local sea urchins.

== See also ==
- Singing hinny

== Sources ==
- Bannerman, Colin (1996). A Friend in the Kitchen: Old Australian Cookery Books. Kenthurst, NSW: Kangaroo Press. ISBN 0-86417-805-0.
- Fulton, Margaret (2005) [1983]. Margaret Fulton's Encyclopedia of Food & Cookery (Revised and updated ed.). Prahran, Victoria: Hardie Grant Books. ISBN 1-74066-270-9.
- Hunwick, Heather (2018). The Food and Drink of Sydney: A History. Lanham, Maryland: Rowman & Littlefield. ISBN 9781442252042.
- Saberi, Helen (2018). Teatimes: A World Tour. London: Reaktion Books. ISBN 978-1-78023-928-6.
- Santich, Barbara (2012). Bold Palates: Australia's Gastronomic Heritage. Kent Town, South Australia: Wakefield Press. ISBN 978-1-74305-113-9.
