= Pumpkin scone =

Australian scone

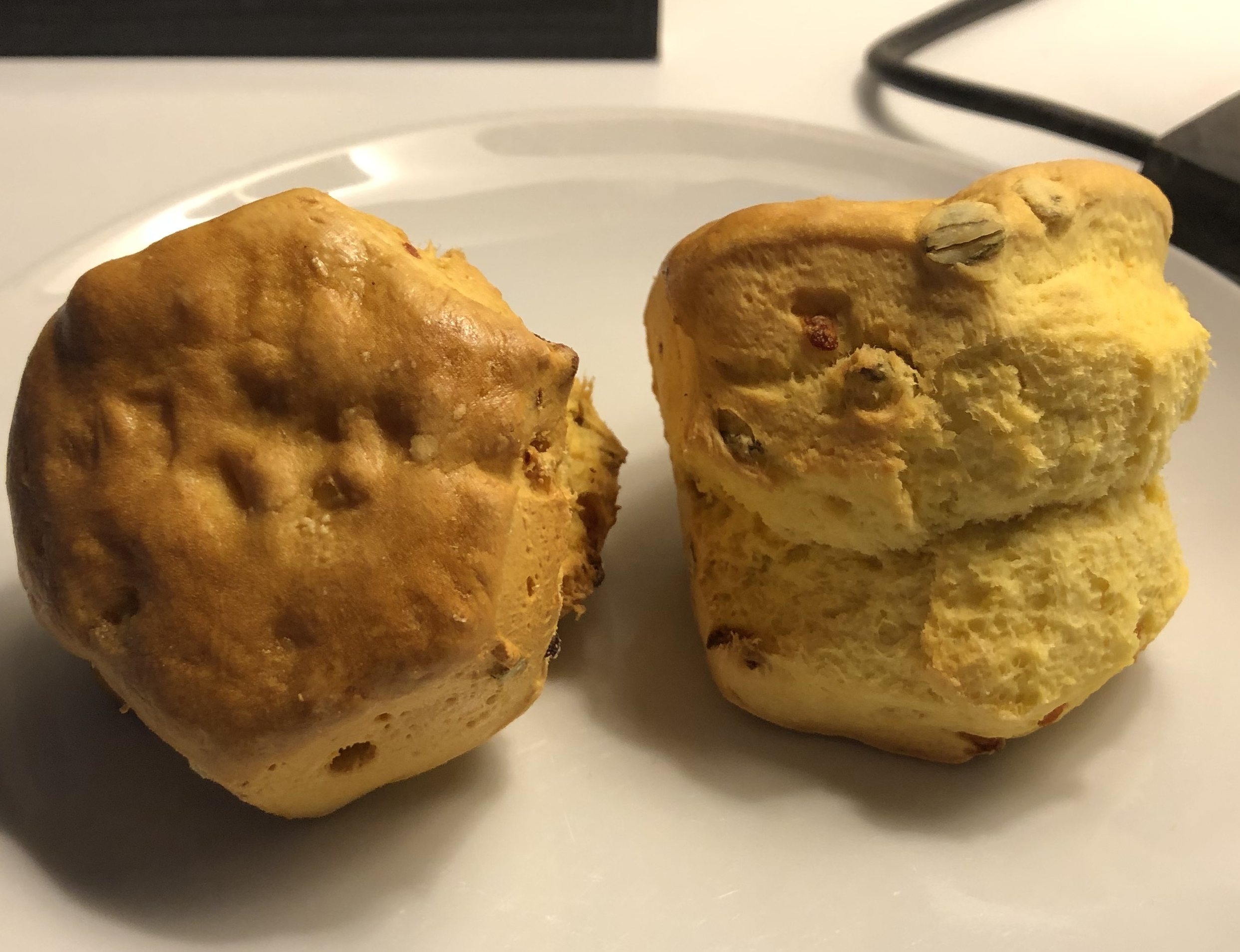
A pair of pumpkin scones

Pumpkin scones are an Australian version of the scone containing mashed pumpkin, and are among the best-known of the desserts that originate from Australia. The pumpkin contributes flavour and texture.

Pumpkin scones were likely developed in Queensland. They are first recorded in a cookbook in 1922, in Australian Home Cookery, though recipes had been around for at least a decade. The earliest identified in the Queensland History Journal came in 1912 from a Beatrice McNicol of Mitchell, Queensland, who included "3 cups flour, ½ cup sugar, ½ cup milk, 1 tabs butter, ½ teas salt, 1 cup mashed pumpkin, 1 teaspoon bicarbonate of soda, 2 teaspoons cream of tartar". By 1916, the pumpkin scone was well-established in Queensland baking competitions, and was appearing in mentions outside of the state, including a recipe published in Kalgoorlie, a city in rural Western Australia. A preparation published in The Chronicle and North Coast Advertiser that year included an assurance that the dish "has been successfully tested by our editor’s own youngsters, who agree in a decided dislike for the vegetable, yet relish the scone", reading:

Half a cup of sugar, 2¾ cups of flour, 1 tablespoonful butter, 1 egg well beaten, 1 cup boiled mashed pumpkin, 1 teaspoon soda, 2 teaspoons cream of tartar. Beat sugar and butter to a cream, add egg, then pumpkin, then flour with cream of tartar, soda, salt, sifted together, lastly a little milk. Bake in a quick oven.

Pumpkins had long been a common element of the Australian diet following their import from the Americas via Britain, but it was in the 1920s, following the development of the Queensland Blue and Triamble varieties, that they became ubiquitous in Australian cooking. Despite the scone variety consistently being most popular in Queensland, they were eaten across the country, as attested to in an article from the Sydney Morning Herald on 10 March 1924, reporting on the Manning River Show: "there were... 78 entries in scones. There were even pumpkin scones, and eight were found eager to win the prize. They at least should be an economical product of the kitchen on the north coast, where almost every cultivated field has its wide spreading pumpkin vines."

Through the 1920s and 1930s, recipes for pumpkin scones, alongside pumpkin soups, fritters, and cakes appeared throughout newspapers. From 1936, pumpkin scones were included on the curriculum of primary school home economics classes in Queensland state schools, ensuring the dish remained relevant in the state. It remained in the curricum in the state until 1984. The scone received a boost in popularity in the late 1960s to 1980s through Florence Bjelke-Petersen, wife of Queensland premier Joh Bjelke-Petersen, who often served them to guests at the Bjelke-Petersen home.

== Sources ==
- Cooke, Glenn R (November 2023). "A tale of pumpkins, pumpkin scones and Senator Lady Flo". Queensland History Journal. 25 (8). doi:10.3316/informit.411646880253596.
- Saberi, Helen (2018). Teatimes: A World Tour. London: Reaktion Books. ISBN 978-1-78023-928-6.
- Santich, Barbara (2012). Bold Palates: Australia's Gastronomic Heritage. Kent Town, South Australia: Wakefield Press. ISBN 978-1-74305-113-9.
- Santich, Barbara (2013) [1996]. Looking for Flavour (Expanded ed.). Kent Town, South Australia: Wakefield Press. ISBN 978 1 74305 207 5.
