= Singing hinny =

Type of bannock, griddle cake or scone

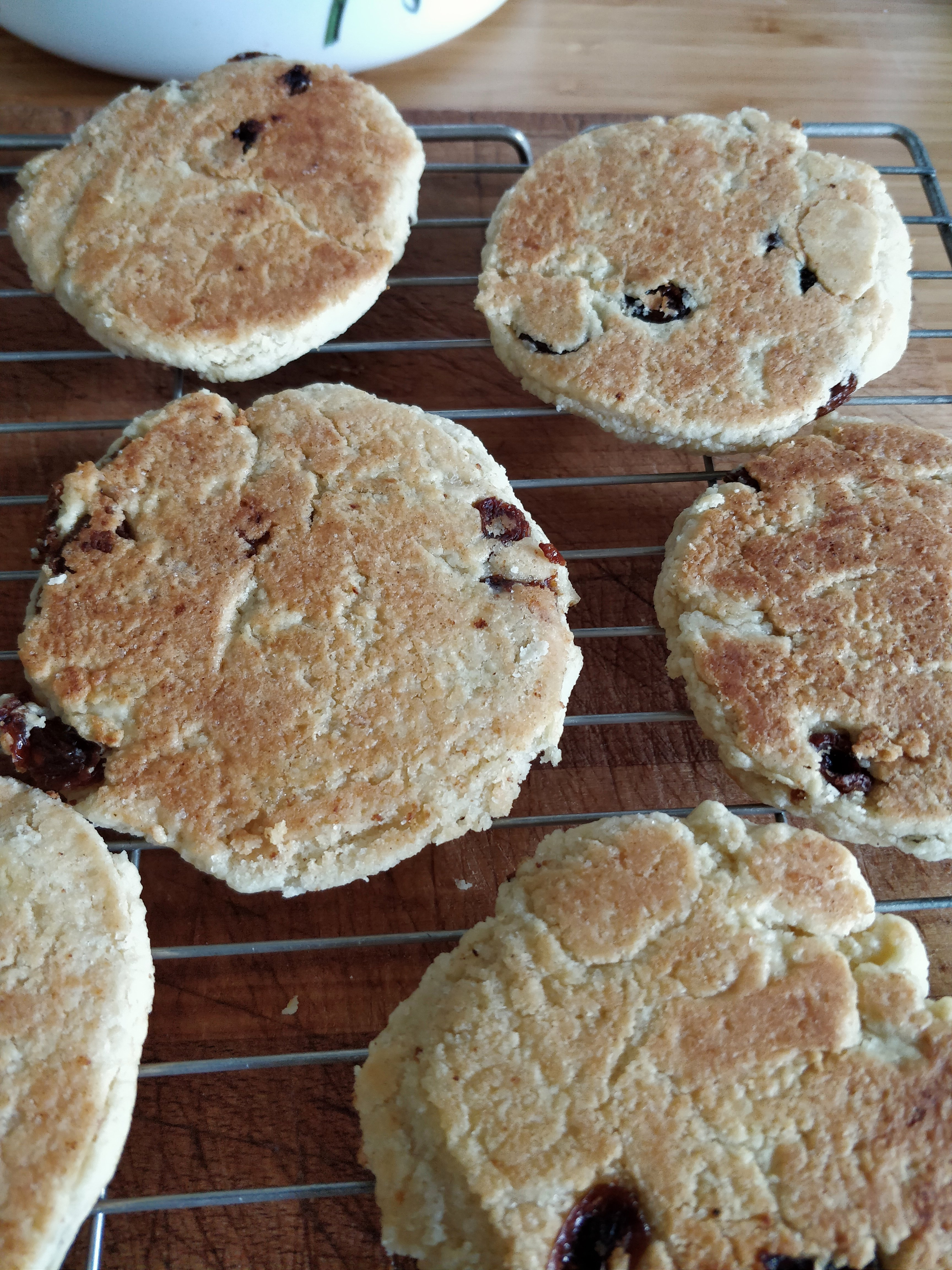
- Alternative names: Singin' hinny, fatty cutty
- Type: Sweet bread
- Place of origin: England
- Region or state: Northumberland
- Main ingredients: Flour, baking powder, lard or butter; currants, milk or buttermilk

A singing hinny or singin' hinny is a type of bannock, griddle cake or scone, made in the north of England, especially Northumberland and the coal-mining areas of the North East. In Scotland, they are known as fatty cutties.

Hinny is a term of endearment in the dialects of the Newcastle area, often applied to young women and children. The singing refers to the sounds of the sizzling of the lard or butter in the rich dough as it is cooked on a hot plate or griddle.

The ingredients typically include flour, baking powder, lard or butter, currants, milk or buttermilk and salt and/or sugar to taste. A dough is made which is rich in fat. This is then rolled into a round flat cake, which is then cooked on a flat griddle or in a skillet. Traditionally it is made as one large cake, but it can also be made into multiple smaller cakes.

== See also ==
- Fat rascal
- Frybread
- Lardy cake
- Puftaloons
- Welsh cake
