= Koffi (restaurant) =

Chain of coffee shops in the U.S. state of California

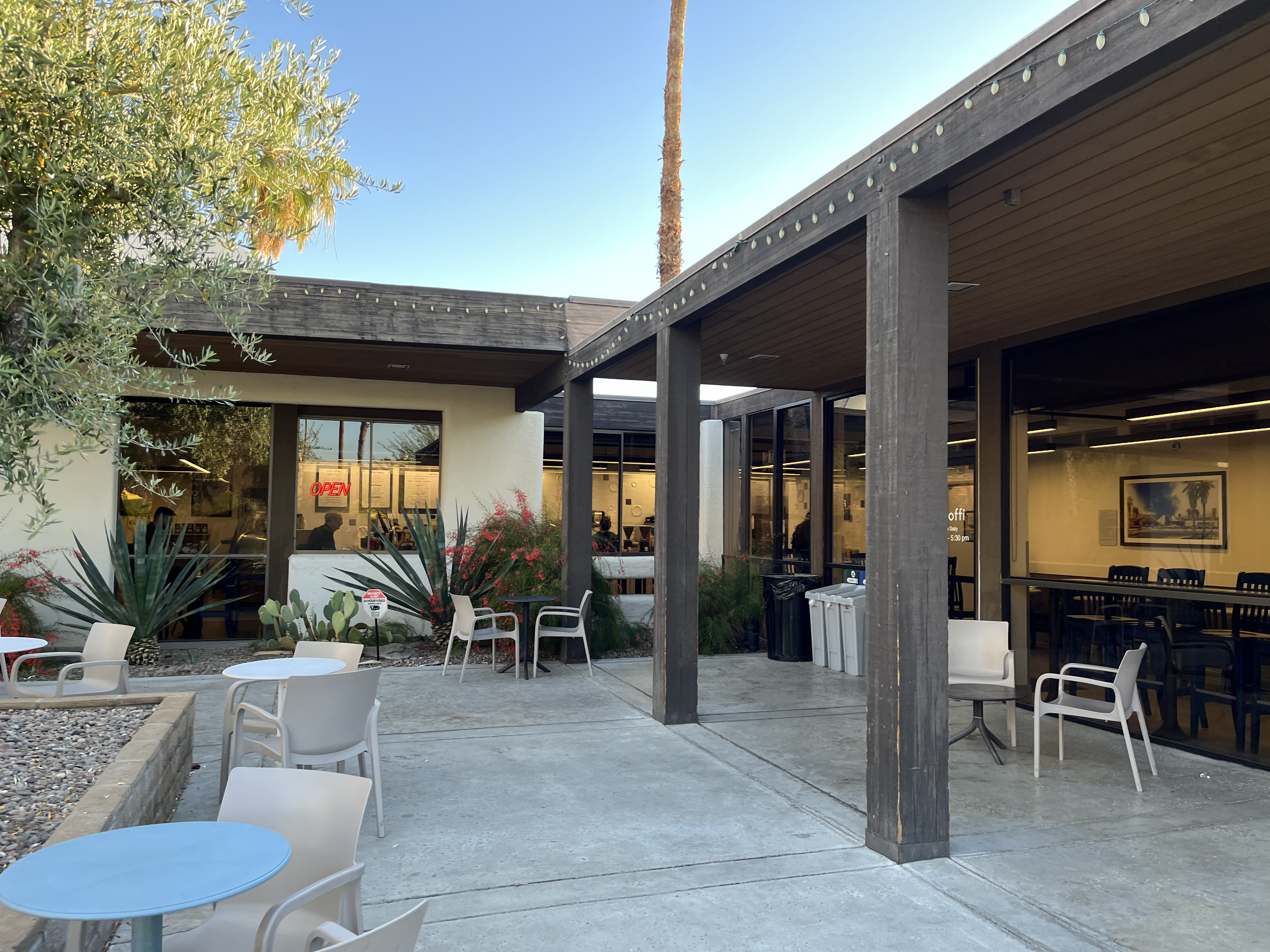
- Exterior of the shop at Kaptur Plaza in Palm Springs, California, in 2024
- Interactive map of Koffi

Restaurant information
- Location: California, United States
- Coordinates: 33.8305°N 116.5470°W

Koffi is a small chain of coffee shops the U.S. state of California. The business was established in Palm Springs in 2008. There are four locations, including three in Palm Springs and another in Rancho Mirage.

John Abner and John Strohm are owners. The original location opened in the 2000s. In addition to coffee, the business serves baked goods such as muffins and scones.

Palm Springs Koffi North is located on North Palm Canyon Drive. It has a landscaped garden.

The fourth location opened on Tahquitz Canyon Way.
