= Bisciola =

Italian sweet bread

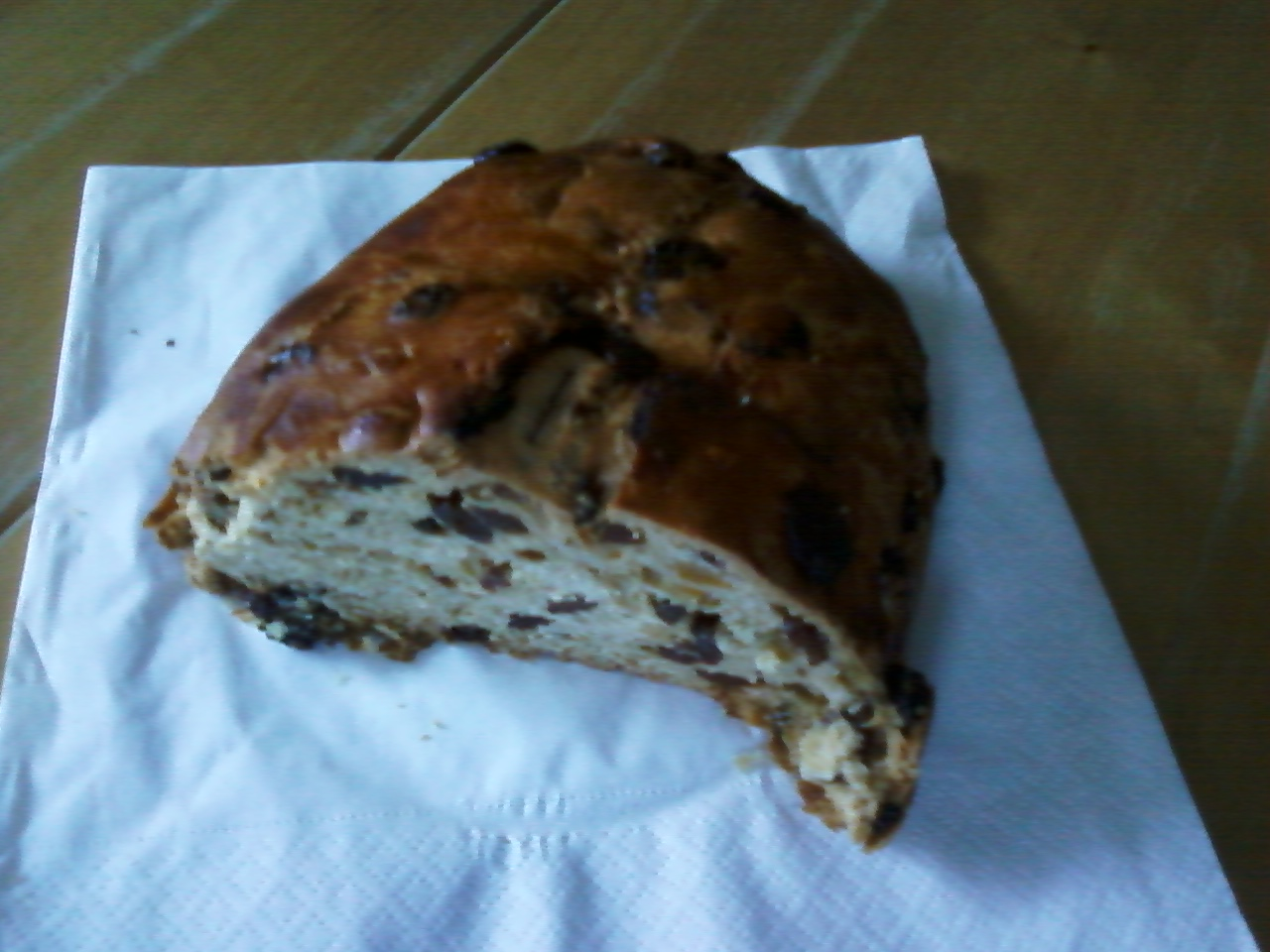
- Alternative names: Panettone valtellinese, pan di fich
- Type: Sweet bread
- Place of origin: Italy
- Region or state: Lombardy
- Serving temperature: Room temperature
- Main ingredients: Buckwheat flour, figs, honey, raisins, walnuts

Bisciola (Italian: [biʃˈʃɔ:la]) is an Italian sweet leavened bread originating in the Valtellina Valley of Lombardy, Italy. It is typically prepared for Christmas, during which time it is an essential component of Christmas festivities.

It is also known as panettone valtellinese, besciola, and pan di fich, the latter a name in the local dialect literally translating as 'fig bread'.

== Etymology ==
The term bisciola probably derives from the Latin buccella, meaning 'morsel'.

A legend states that in 1797, Napoleon was passing through the region and ordered his cook to prepare a sweet using local ingredients. The cook obtained buckwheat flour, butter, dried figs, grapes, honey, and nuts, and created what came to be known as bisciola. However, according to La cucina Italiana, Napoleon was never in Valtellina.

Since bisciola was traditionally a peasant food, its original recipe was never recorded and is probably an "ancient cake recipe".

== Description ==
The bread has been described as having a rustic appearance and likened to a more traditional panettone. It is a tasty, firm and crunchy loaf with pleasant scent. Like similar sweet breads from Italy, including colomba pasquale, pandolce, pandoro, and panettone, the final prepared bisciola has a humidity ranging from 18% to 24%.

It is usually served after pranzo (lunch) or Christmas dinner, either at room temperature or slightly warmed. Outside of meals, it is often dipped in grappa or coffee. It may also be served with zabaione.

== Preparation ==
The bread requires a natural sourdough to prepare. The flour used is any of rye flour, type 00 wheat flour, or whole-wheat flour. Artisanal versions are made using buckwheat flour. The dough is additionally composed of butter, milk, sugar, and yeast. Ingredients added to the dough mixture include dried figs, honey, raisins, and walnuts. Some versions may substitute one or more of those ingredients with hazelnuts, pine nuts, almonds, or dried apricots.

The process requires from 20 to 36 hours to obtain the full sourdough; a mother dough (also known as a starter) is mixed with the flour and water, then set aside to leaven for up to 6 hours. To this is then added more flour and water and is again set aside to leaven for 3–4 hours. In the final sourdough stage, more flour and water are added, and a small portion set aside to leaven 18–36 hours. This is the new mother dough, and the rest is divided into smaller portions and used to prepare bisciola. To the mix of each portion is added dried figs, raisins, and walnuts, all of which have been cut into pieces, and are thoroughly integrated into the dough, after which it is set aside to leaven for about an hour. It is then shaped into a loaf, given an egg wash, and baked for 40–50 minutes.

== Geographic mark ==
On 7 June 2013, the bread was granted a Marchio Collettivo Geografico, an unregistered geographic trademark, after a workgroup consisting of the Chamber of Commerce of Sondrio and various producers in the region established the characteristics of the bread, constituent ingredients, acceptable local substitutes, and conditions for use of the term bisciola. It also specified the Regolamento d’uso del Marchio Collettivo "Bisciola", which states the licensing terms for the use of the term bisciola.

The control plan defined by the group specifies that the producer is responsible for guaranteeing the region of production (always within Sondrio), ingredients employed in production, the means of production, the process of kneading the dough, the shape into which it is formed, and the baking process. The packager must ensure that the product is sourced from and packaged in Sondrio, ensure that the baked product conforms to the defined standards and characteristics, verify the presence of required ingredients, and apply labelling identifying the product's source and indicating that it conforms to the Regolamento d’uso del Marchio Collettivo "Bisciola".

== See also ==
- List of Italian desserts and pastries
