= Florence Bjelke-Petersen =

Australian politician (1919–2017)

Lady Florence Bjelke-Petersen
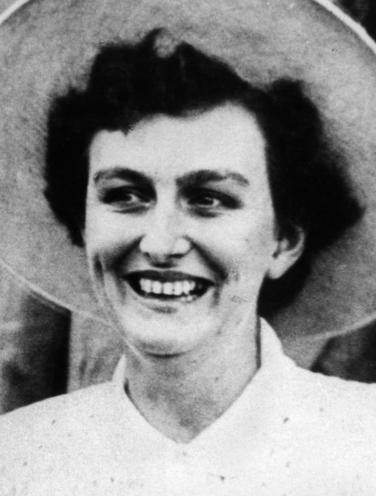
- On her wedding day, 31 May 1952

Senator for Queensland
- In office 12 March 1981 – 30 June 1993
- Preceded by: Glen Sheil
- Succeeded by: John Woodley

Personal details
- Born: Florence Isabel Gilmour; 11 August 1919 Brisbane, Queensland, Australia
- Died: 18 December 2017 (aged 98) Kingaroy, Queensland, Australia
- Party: National
- Spouse: Joh Bjelke-Petersen (m. 1952–2005)
- Children: 4

Florence Isabel Bjelke-Petersen (née Gilmour; 11 August 1919 – 18 December 2017) was an Australian politician. She was a member of the Australian Senate from 1981 to 1993, and was the wife of the longest-serving Premier of Queensland, Sir Joh Bjelke-Petersen. She was styled as Lady Bjelke-Petersen upon her husband's knighthood, and was also known informally as Lady Flo.

== Early life ==
Florence Isabel Gilmour was born in Brisbane, as the eldest of two daughters of James Pollock Gilmour, an accountant and company secretary, and his wife Florence Mabel (née Low). She was raised at the Brisbane riverside suburb of New Farm. She started her schooling at the New Farm State School, and later attended the prestigious Brisbane Girls' Grammar School. She was employed as a private secretary to the Queensland Commissioner for Main Roads when she met Johannes Bjelke-Petersen, who was then a Country Party member of the Legislative Assembly of Queensland. They were married on 31 May 1952 at the Fortitude Valley Presbyterian Church.

== Career ==
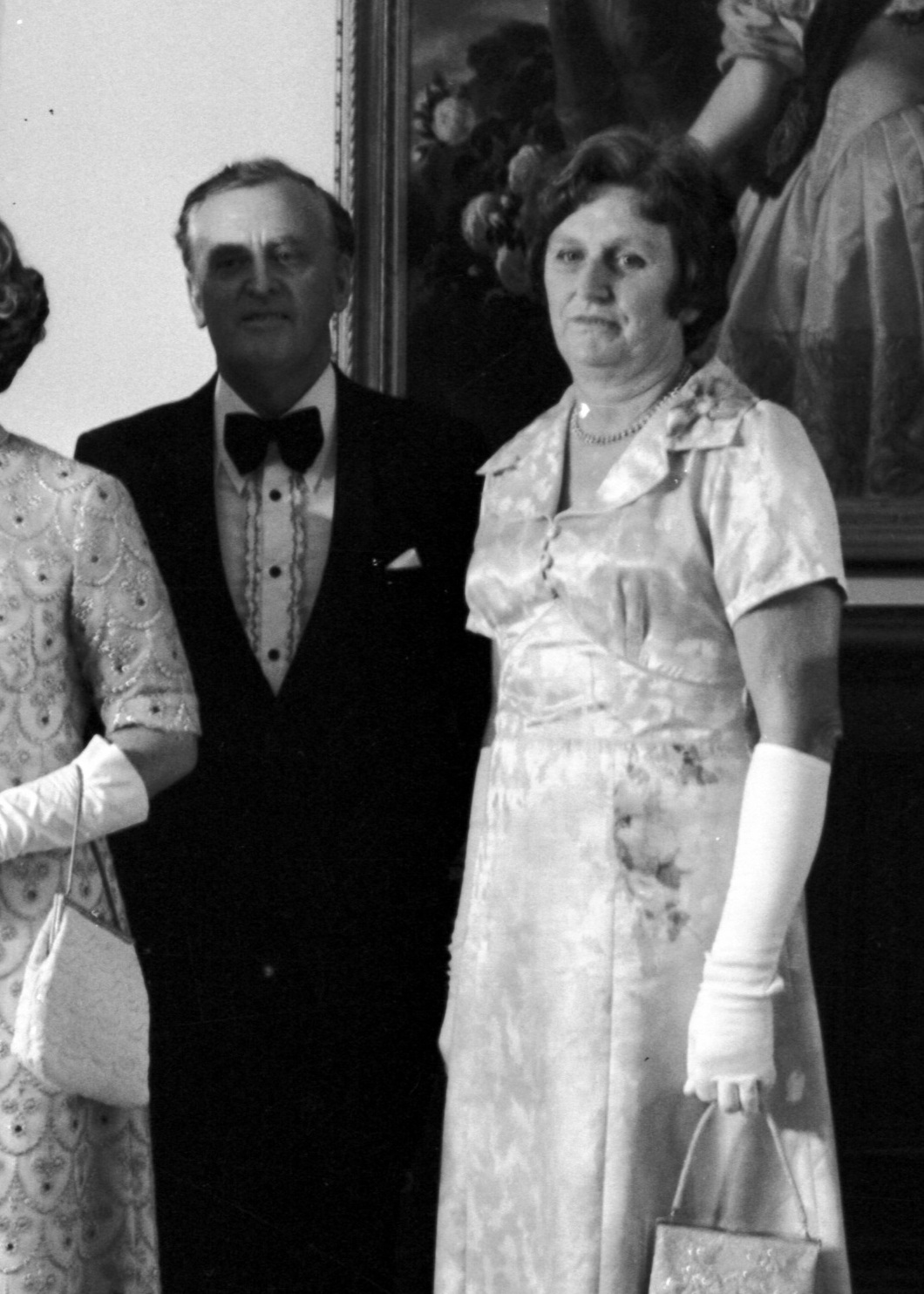
Bjelke-Petersen and her husband during the royal tour in 1977

Bjelke-Petersen was preoccupied with home duties until well after Joh Bjelke-Petersen became Premier in 1968. In the 1970s, however, she assumed an increasingly public role, as part of the Queensland National Party's increasing promotion of a Bjelke-Petersen "personality cult". Her simple, homespun sayings and her recipes and affection for pumpkin scones were often associated with her in the media.

At the 1980 federal election, against the wishes of party president Robert Sparkes, Joh Bjelke-Petersen arranged for his wife to be placed in the number one position on the National Party's Queensland senate ticket, ensuring her election. Her term was due to commence on 1 July 1981, however, on 6 February 1981, Queensland Senator Glen Sheil resigned, creating a casual vacancy. She was appointed on 12 March 1981 for the remainder of Sheil's term, and then continued into her own term.

Bjelke-Petersen crossed the floor 18 times during her career, the 12th-most of any MP between 1950 and 2019 and the second-most by a woman after Kathy Sullivan.

== Knighthood ==
When Joh Bjelke-Petersen was knighted in 1984, Flo Bjelke-Petersen became Lady Bjelke-Petersen, and was officially known as "Senator Lady Bjelke-Petersen". She was frequently referred to as "Lady Florence" or "Lady Flo".

== Later career ==
She was re-elected at the 1983 and 1987 elections (both double dissolutions), and her term expired on 30 June 1993, when she decided to retire.

== Death ==
On 18 December 2017, Bjelke-Petersen died at the age of 98 after suffering a short illness. She died in Kingaroy at Orana Aged Care where she had resided since August 2014. Prime Minister Malcolm Turnbull and Queensland Premier Annastacia Palaszczuk offered to hold a state funeral which was accepted by their son John Bjelke-Petersen. It was held in the Kingaroy Town Hall.

== Cookbook publication ==
She published a cookbook which included her recipe for her trademark pumpkin scones.
