= Fat rascal =

Traditional cake from Yorkshire

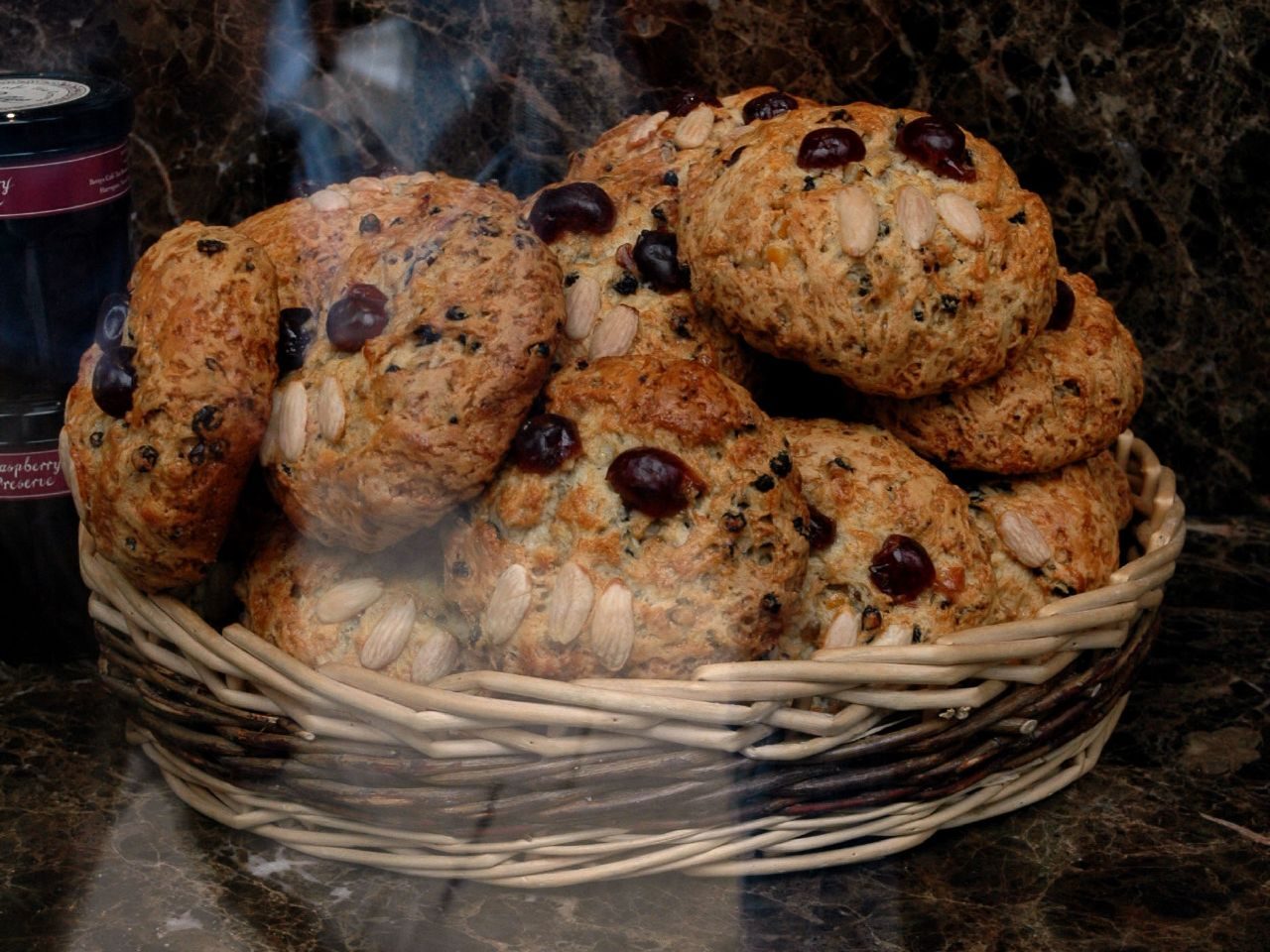
- Fat rascals at Bettys Cafe Tearooms
- Alternative names: Turf cake (historical)
- Type: Cake/biscuit
- Place of origin: England
- Region or state: Yorkshire
- Main ingredients: Currants and candied peel

A fat rascal, closely related to the historical turf cake, is a type of cake, similar to a scone or rock cake in both taste and ingredients. It originated in Yorkshire at least as early as the 19th century.

== History ==
Fat rascals were known in the Yorkshire region in the nineteenth century as a form of tea cake containing butter and cream. An 1859 Charles Dickens story identifies the fat rascal with the singing hinny of Northumberland. A fat rascal could also be baked as a turf cake, a buttery, flat cake baked in a covered pan among the ashes of a peat fire, and the terms fat rascal and turf cake are sometimes used interchangeably. A Yorkshire cookery book of 1973 had plain flour, baking powder, butter and currants as the ingredients. A 1980 Yorkshire cookbook described fat rascals as a means of using leftover pastry, typically consisting of scraps of shortcrust pastry, sugared, sprinkled with currants and rolled into thick flat cakes before baking. Fat rascals, whatever their composition, do not appear to have been widely known outside the Yorkshire region until the 1980s, although there are occasional mentions in other regions, such as in Rye, Sussex in Ford Madox Ford's 1931 memoirs.

There is a recipe for fat rascals in a book called "The Presidents' Cook Book" by Poppy Cannon and Patricia Brooks, published in 1968 by Funk and Wagnalls in the USA. They say "In Edith Roosevelt's most cherished cook book .... is this recipe for hot biscuits." This cook book now rests on a shelf in the parlour of Sagamore Hill.

== Bettys ==
A widely recognised version of the fat rascal was introduced by Bettys Café Tea Rooms in North Yorkshire in 1983. This is a plump, fruity scone with a 'face' made from cherries and almonds based on a rock cake recipe, developed by Helen Frankel, then a buyer and marketing assistant at Bettys. Following its launch, the fat rascal quickly became Bettys' best known and best-selling bakery product, selling over 375,000 per year. Bettys & Taylors of Harrogate own the registered trademark for the name 'fat rascal'.

== See also ==
- Florentine biscuit
- Singing hinny
