= Honey bun =

Fried yeast pastry

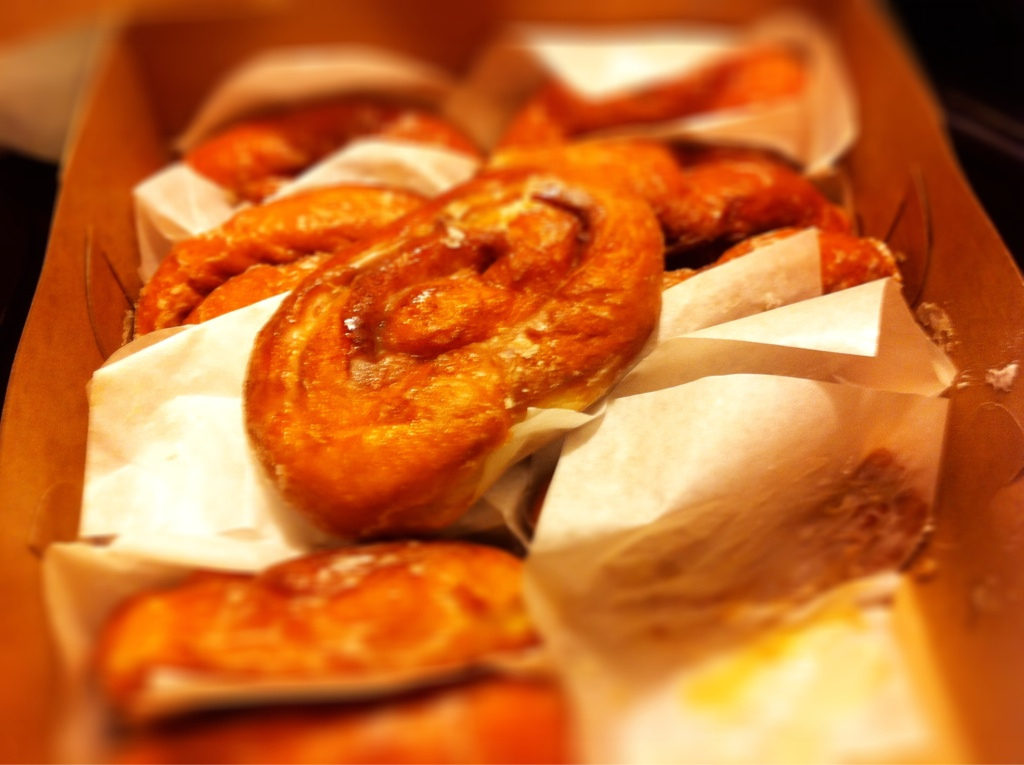
- Commercially-prepared honey buns
- Type: Sweet roll
- Place of origin: United States
- Region or state: North Carolina
- Created by: Howard Griffin
- Main ingredients: Honey, yeast, cinnamon
- Variations: Some honey buns may have varying types of icing

A honey bun, or honeybun, (Note: honeybun on Wiktionary) is a fried yeast sweet roll that contains honey and a swirl of cinnamon in the dough and is glazed with icing. Unlike most sweet rolls, which are generally the product of bakeries, honey buns are common convenience store and vending machine fare made by companies like Little Debbie, Hostess and Duchess. Normally sold individually wrapped, alone, or in boxes, they are a snack or grab-and-go breakfast or dessert item which can be eaten at cold, hot, or ambient temperatures.

== History ==
Louis Griffin ran a restaurant in Winston-Salem, North Carolina and commissioned his mother Ellen Griffin to make small pies. These became so popular that in 1926, Griffin sold his restaurant and opened a home bakery service in Greensboro, North Carolina to sell small fried pies to local restaurants. In 1929, he expanded further and formed the Griffin Baking Company. Louis' oldest son Nelson Griffin, Sr. joined the company and started the Griffin Pie Co. in Charleston, West Virginia in 1949. They opened factories in West Virginia, Tennessee, Florida, Georgia, Mississippi, and their flagship factory in London, Kentucky. Louis' brother Howard Griffin reportedly developed the honey bun in Greensboro, NC in 1954, and it became a signature product. His nephew Nelson Griffin, Jr. said "In the early 50’s they were making cinnamon rolls. From that, he (Howard) added honey to the ingredients, and eventually developed the first commercial honey bun." They eventually sold to Flowers Foods in 1983.

== Culture ==
Honey buns are also used as currency in United States prisons, where they are sold from prison commissaries. In the state of Florida, 270,000 are sold per month as of 2010. In a highly publicized instance, honey buns were used by guards in Miami to pay for the beating of a teenager in a youth detention center, resulting in the teen's death. Referring to the case, a public defender was quoted as saying, "In here, a honey bun is like a million dollars." In February 2026, a jail officer in Morgan County, Alabama was charged with seven felony extortion charges related to taking honey buns from inmates.

Flower Foods' London, KY bakery, which can produce almost 60,000 honey buns an hour or about 10 million honey buns per week, has sponsored an annual Honey Bun Day since 2021, which is celebrated on October 19. The 2023 festival broke the Guinness World Record for most people eating honey buns at the same time with 777 people.

== See also ==
- Cinnamon roll
- List of buns
- List of sweet breads
- Monkey bread
- Sticky bun
- Sweet roll
