= Carolina Foods =

American food company

Carolina Foods, Inc.
- Type: Private
- Industry: Food, sweet goods
- Founded: 1934
- Headquarters: Charlotte, North Carolina, United States
- Key people: Paul Scarborough, president Katie Scarborough, CFO
- Products: Duchess-brand snack foods
- Number of employees: 425 (2014)

Carolina Foods Incorporated is a private confectionery corporation and bakery headquartered in Charlotte, North Carolina, United States. Founded in 1934, it is known for its Duchess brand honey buns and doughnuts and has been featured on the Food Network.

== History ==
Vernon Scarborough founded Carolina Foods in Charlotte in 1934 as a sandwich company that expanded after World War II. Operating out of his basement, Scarborough made lunches for workers at local textile and furniture factories. Gradually, he introduced honey buns as complementary product. Following the war, the company expanded to its first location on South Boulevard in South Charlotte, where it expanded its confectionery offerings to doughnuts and pies, in addition to the growing popularity of its honey buns.

Carolina Foods has expanded into a 100,000 square foot plant. It employs 425 people and produces 1 million honey buns per day, in addition to its other products, which include the Duchess brand doughnuts and Dunkin Sticks. It was the top "snack food" brand in Puerto Rico in 2014 according to the company's president. In an interview, the current president claimed that revenues doubled between 2009 and 2014. At the same time, increasing sugar prices hurt the company's profitability.

=== Nutrition ===
Carolina Foods acknowledged shifting consumer preferences toward healthier snacks in 2014. The chief financial officer (CFO) stated that Carolina Foods would not be able to change product offerings to accommodate this shift without also expanding the current production facility to produce them.

=== Leadership ===
Carolina Foods is a third-generation family-owned business. The president is Paul Scarborough. His daughter Katie Scarborough is the CFO. Kent Byrom is the General Manager.

== Awards and recognition ==
In 2004 and 2009, Carolina Foods' products were featured on the Food Network series Unwrapped. In 2015, Unwrapped 2.0 featured Carolina Foods' honey buns on its premiere episode.
