= School bread =

Norwegian sweet roll

Skolebrød, Skolebolle
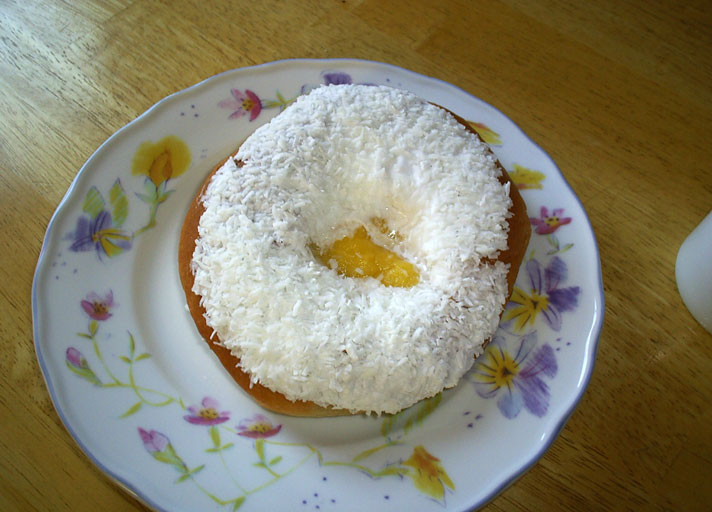
- Type: Sweet roll
- Place of origin: Norway
- Main ingredients: yeasted dough, custard, icing, coconut

A school bread or school bun (Norwegian: skolebrød in northern and eastern Norway, skolebolle in western Norway or porke and tolvøres in southern Norway) is a Norwegian sweet roll made from yeasted dough filled with custard and decorated with icing dipped in grated coconut. It was usually put in school lunches as a dessert or sold at bake sales, hence the name.

In Arctic Norway, a similar roll without icing and coconut (known as a solbolle) is eaten to celebrate the return of the sun after polar night.

== History ==
This type of pastry appeared in the 1950s.

In the 1970s, controversy arose over the pastry's name. When the discussion about children and young people eating too much sugar and sweets came up, there were several people who advocated that calling a high-calorie bun "bread" could contribute to it becoming something people ate on a daily basis. Skolebolle therefore became a new word that decade.

In 2017, the Information Office for Bread and Grain took the initiative to introduce a separate "School Bread Day". This day has been added to the last Friday before the school's summer holidays.

Norwegians are also divided on the question of how to eat a school bread. According to a survey carried out by the Information Office for Bread and Grain in 2021, 50% of Norwegians eat the school bread crosswise like a regular bun. 47% eat their way around and save the yellow for the end.

== See also ==
- List of custard desserts
- List of Norwegian desserts
- List of sweet breads
