= Mosbolletjies =

South African sweet bread

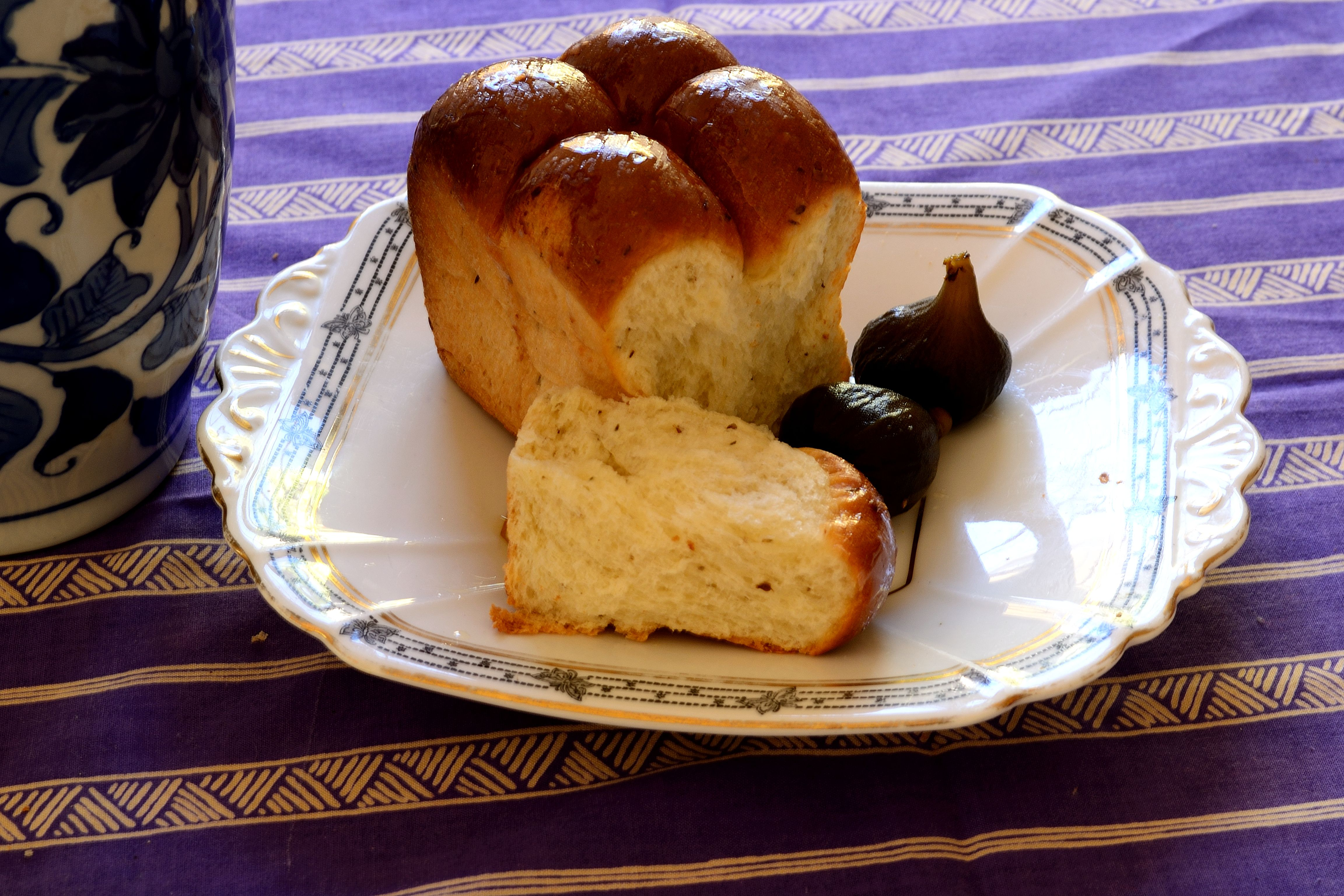
- Mosbolletjies are sweetened, leavened yeast buns flavoured with caraway and/or aniseed
- Course: Dessert
- Place of origin: South Africa
- Region or state: Cape Winelands
- Created by: N/A
- Invented: late 1600s–1700s
- Main ingredients: Flour, salt, butter, sugar, yeast, grape juice, milk, aniseed
- Variations: Multiple

Mosbolletjies is a traditional Afrikaner or Cape Dutch sweet-bun or bread traditionally made in the wine producing areas of the Western Cape province of South Africa. The name is Afrikaans in origin and is a combination of mos (Afrikaans for partially fermented grape juice) and bolletjies (Afrikaans for "balls" or "buns"). Mosbolletjies can be dried to make rusks. The buns are typically served with tea or coffee.

== History ==
The bun originated from French Huguenots refugees who settled the town of Franschhoek in 1688 and introduced viticulture to the region. Mosbolletjies were typically made during the wine making season when its key ingredient was readily available.

== Composition ==
Traditionally grape must left over from the production of wine was used to as a leavening agent and added to dough. Spices such as aniseed are added and the mixed dough is then baked. In modern times grape juice and yeast are typically used instead of grape must.

The dough of the buns are rolled into balls and packed tightly into a baking tray giving it a consistent series of bumps that once baked make individual pieces easy to pull off, similar to monkey bread.

== See also ==
- List of African dishes
- List of sweet breads
