= Dripping cake =

British traditional bread

- Alternative names: Drippers
- Type: Sweet bread
- Place of origin: Great Britain
- Main ingredients: Dripping, flour, brown sugar, spices, currants, raisins

A dripping cake, also known as a dripper, is a traditional bread from Great Britain. The main ingredients are dripping, flour, yeast, brown sugar, spices, currants and raisins. The ingredients are mixed thoroughly and baked in an oven.

Variations of dripping cake can be found in Wales, and in parts of England including Gloucestershire and Yorkshire. In Gloucestershire the dripping is allowed to form a toffee-like layer at the base of the cake. It can be confused with the lardy cake, which is very similar apart from the principal ingredient being lard instead of beef dripping.

As dripping is left over from cooking a joint of meat, it is economical and filling, and has long been a popular snack with schoolchildren. Dripping cakes are very rich and sweet, and despite contemporary concerns about high-calorie, high-fat foods, are still popular.

== See also ==
- List of British breads
- List of cakes
