= Double buddy =

Philippine bread with desiccated coconut meat

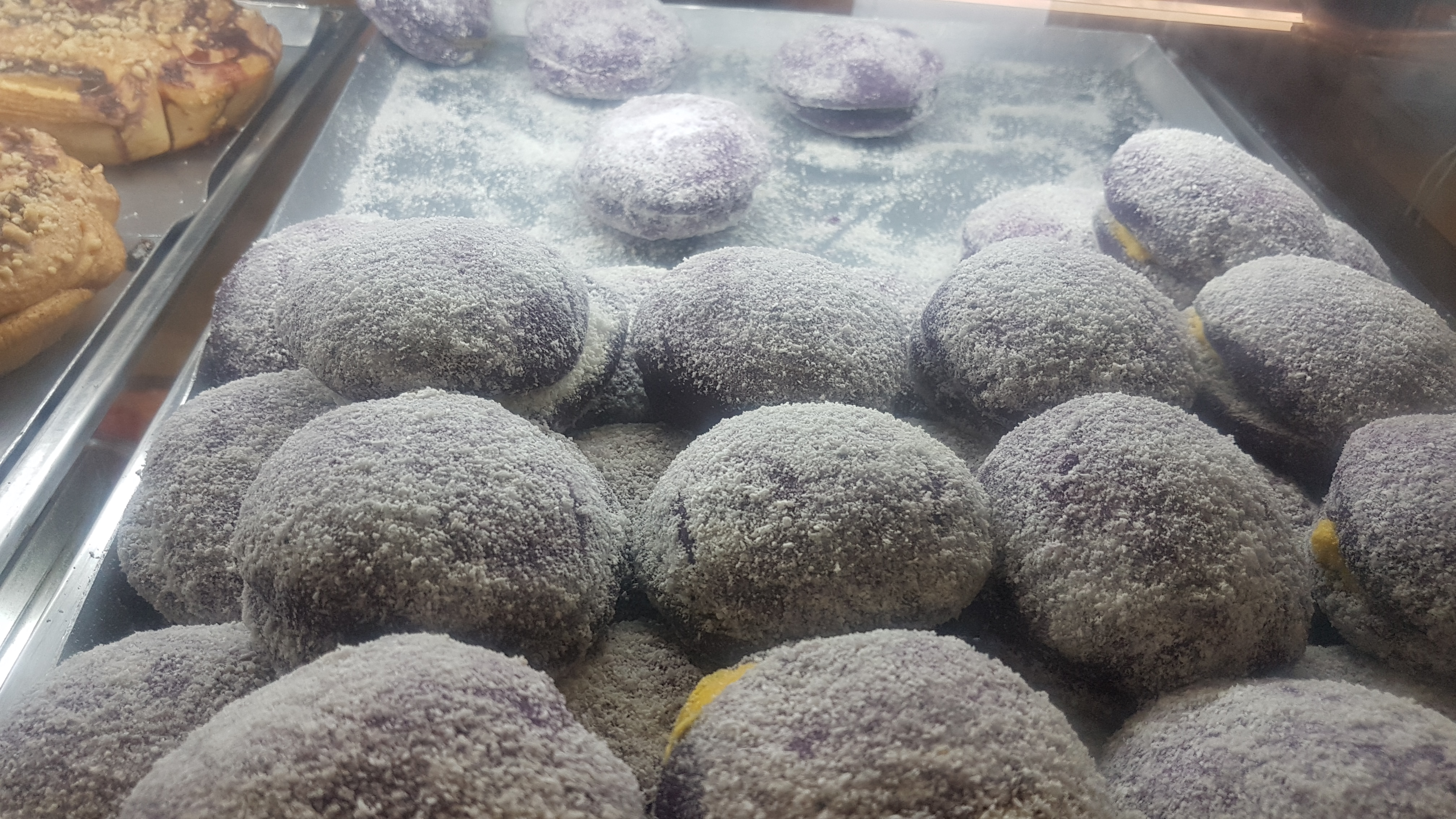
- Type: Sweet roll
- Course: Dessert, merienda, or snack
- Place of origin: Philippines
- Serving temperature: Room temperature
- Main ingredients: Flour, water, margarine/butter, brown sugar, milk, eggs, vanilla extract, baking powder, desiccated coconut meat
- Variations: Pandesal

Double buddy, also known as double body bread, yo-yo bread, lambingan bread, or buddy-buddy is a sweet Filipino bread with ube and vanilla varieties and is covered in desiccated coconut. It is a kind of bread that is made of two fluffy round domes of moist breads that are held together, resembling the traditional toy yo-yo.

== Description ==
Double buddy diverges from pandesal, a staple Filipino bread roll commonly eaten for breakfast. While double buddy is best for snack or dessert.

The bread is known for the taste of the Filipinos since the 1990s, but there is no precise history of double buddy is documented to this day. The possible origin of double buddy is from the besos pan dulce (Mexican yo-yo bread), a bread which was introduced by Spaniards to the Philippines which is their another colony aside from Mexico which the besos pan dulce originated. It was speculated that it originates from this kind of bread because of its similarities.

Behind the bread's name is truly equate to itself for its other name is lambingan which means "sweet affection" in Tagalog, because of the two pieces of round domes of bread pieced together that look like they're hugging each other that is why it was called a "double buddy," with a sandwich of cream of unsalted butter between the two pieces of bread.

The texture of the bread is a little bit crumbly and not so sweet pound cake. The bread also gives a creamy taste to the consumer because of its main ingredient is the milk powder. Outside its filling is the desiccated coconut instead of breadcrumbs which is for pandesal. The other most common ingredients for the double buddy are flour, water, margarine/butter, brown sugar, eggs, vanilla extract, and baking powder.

Another variety of double buddy is ube. For ube double buddy, a violet food coloring (ube extract) has to be added by a baker to make it purple. Double buddy bread can also have two flavors at the same time which are pieced together with its other flavor, with one of its bread is vanilla (white) while the other is ube (purple).

Double buddy is great for standalone snack.

== See also ==
- Pandesal
- Besos pan dulce
