= Manilla Express =

Australian weekly newspaper

Manilla Express, 21 January 1899

Manilla Express is a weekly English language newspaper published in Manilla, New South Wales, Australia.

The Manilla Express started publication on 14 January 1899. From 1899 to 1905 the paper was published weekly and changed to a bi-weekly publication, published Tuesdays and Fridays, from 1906. It was first published in broadsheet format in 1899 before changing to tabloid size. It is now published weekly on Saturdays.

Parts of the paper have been digitised as part of the Australian Newspaper Digitisation Program project of the National Library of Australia.

== See also ==
- List of newspapers in Australia
- List of newspapers in New South Wales
