= The Chronicle and North Coast Advertiser =

Newspaper published in Nambour, Queensland, Australia (1903–1922)

The Chronicle and North Coast Advertiser, front page of first issue, 31 July 1903

The Chronicle and North Coast Advertiser was a newspaper published in Nambour, Queensland, Australia.

The first issue was published on 31 July 1903 by proprietor and editor, Luke Wilkinson. The last issue was published in 1983.

Issues from 1903 to 1922 have been digitised and are available through Trove.
