= Lardy cake =

English form of sweet spiced bread

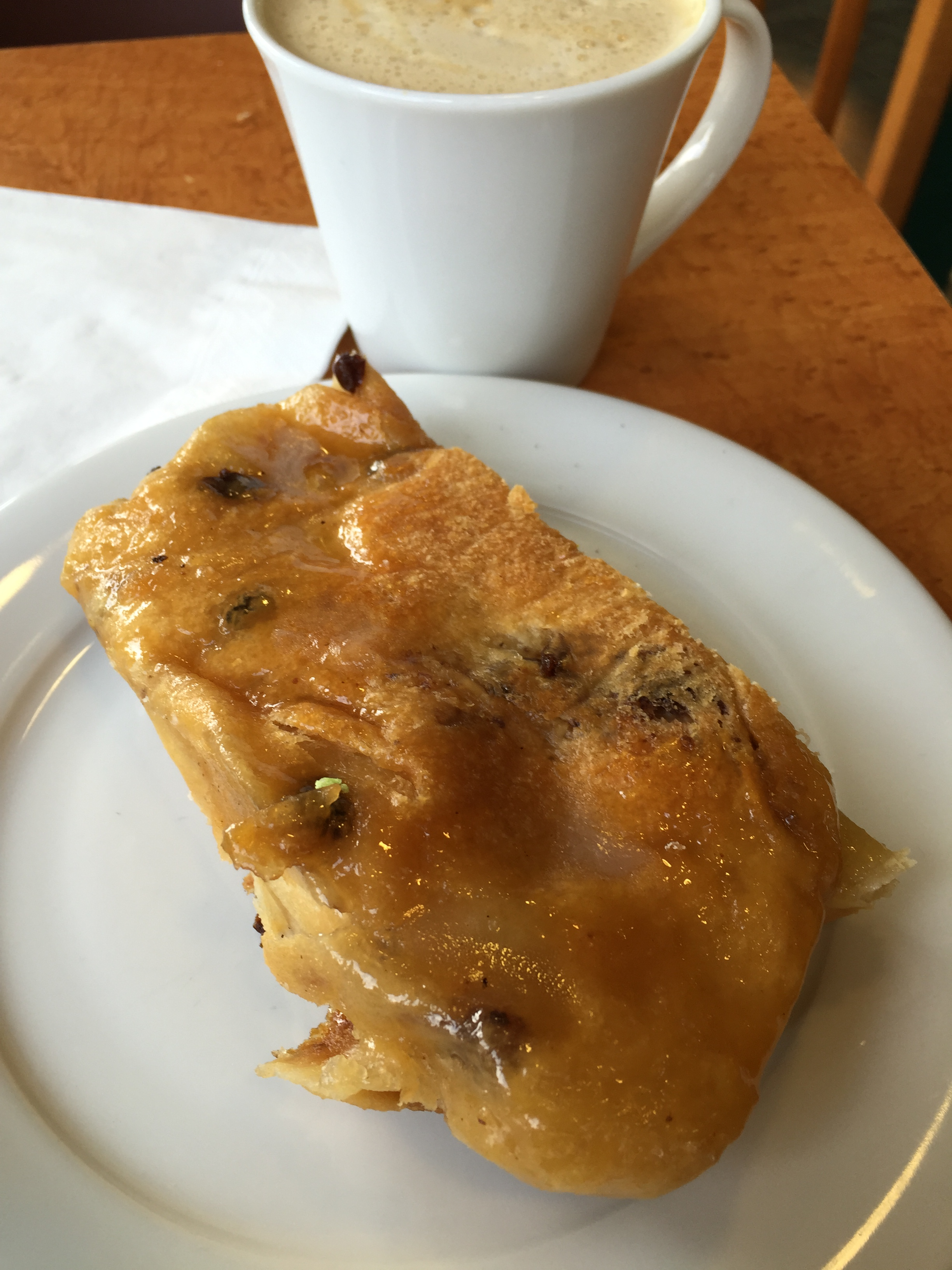
- Alternative names: Lardy bread, lardy johns, dough cake, fourses cake
- Type: Bread
- Place of origin: England
- Region or state: South and west
- Main ingredients: Rendered lard, flour, sugar, spices, currants and raisins
- Variations: Dripping cake

Lardy cake, also known as lardy bread, lardy Johns, dough cake, and fourses cake, is a traditional spiced bread enriched with lard and found in several southern counties of England, including Sussex, Surrey, Hampshire, Berkshire, Wiltshire, Dorset, and Gloucestershire, each claiming to be the original source. It remains a popular weekend tea cake.

== Description ==
The main ingredients are freshly rendered lard, flour, sugar, spices, currants and raisins. Lardy cake is a traditional English tea bread popular in country areas in England. It is made from plain bread dough enriched with sticky sweet lard and sugar as well as dried fruit and mixed spices. The dough is rolled and folded several times, in a similar way to puff pastry, which gives a layered texture.

== History ==
Lardy cakes were cakes for special celebrations. They were made at harvest days or for family festivals. They were, like gingerbread, also sold at local fairs. In 1977, Elizabeth David remarks that "It was only when sugar became cheap, and when the English taste for sweet things—particularly in the Midlands and the North—became more pronounced, that such rich breads or cakes were made or could be bought from the bakery every week."

Lardy cake is said to originate on "the borders of the chalk-line in England running from Wiltshire through Oxfordshire to Cambridgeshire".

In the days when ovens were fired only once a week, and in some households only once a fortnight, for the baking of a very large batch of bread and dough products, any dough not used for making the daily bread was transformed into richer products such as lardy cakes, which thus earned the alternative name 'scrap cakes'. They might also be called 'flead cakes'—flead is a light kind of lard scraped off a pig's internal membranes. The high fat content in such cakes would prevent them from drying out as quickly as ordinary bread. As reported by the author Elizabeth David, a Hampshire cookbook advises that the cake be turned upside down after baking "so the lard can soak through." It is theoretically possible to substitute butter for lard, but as David puts it: "How could they be Lardy cakes without lard?"

A variation of the lardy cake is the dripping cake. In Hampshire, a form of the cake was made without currants which is said to relate the Hampshire lardy cake to Surrey lardy rolls and Guildford manchets.

== Method of making ==
According to food writer Elizabeth David, the lard in lardy cakes is nearly always "worked into plain dough after the first rising or proving". David also says that "if you can't lay your hands on pure pork lard, don't attempt lardy cakes".

== See also ==
- List of British breads
