= Scone =

Baked goods

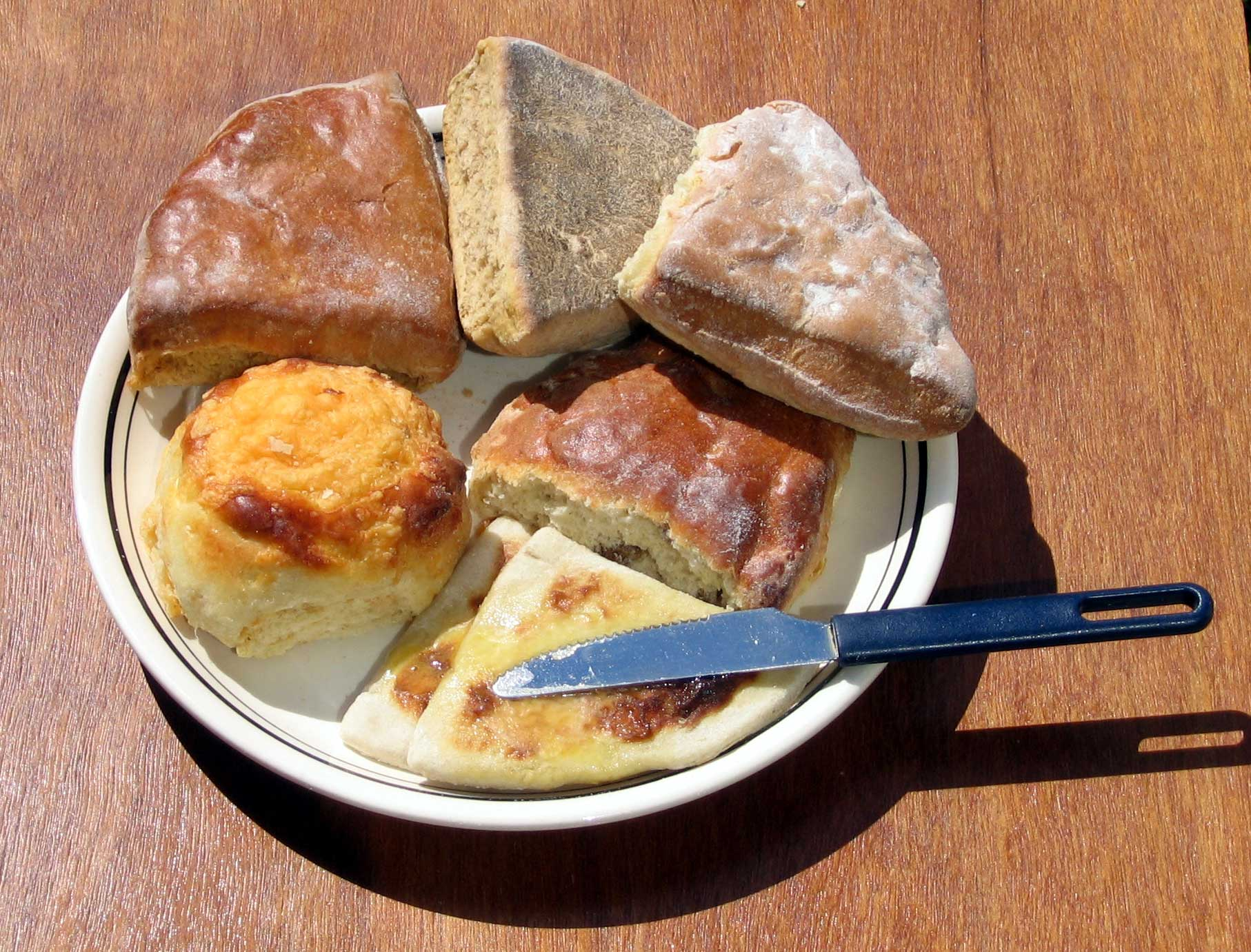
- Clockwise from bottom: hot buttered tattie scones next to a cheese scone, shiny and flat treacle scones, and a milk scone above a fruit scone
- Type: Cake
- Place of origin: United Kingdom
- Main ingredients: Wheat, barley, or oatmeal

A scone (/skɒn/ SKON or /skoʊn/ SKOHN) is a traditional British and Irish baked good, popular in the United Kingdom, Ireland, Canada, Australia and New Zealand. In the US, scones are a different baked product from the rest of the world, usually sweeter, triangular in shape and served on their own. Scones are usually made of either wheat flour or oatmeal, with baking powder as a leavening agent, and baked on sheet pans, or fried in a frying pan. A scone can be either lightly sweetened or savoury, and can be occasionally glazed with egg wash. The sweetened scone is a basic component of the cream tea, and the afternoon tea. It differs from teacakes and other types of sweet breads that are made with yeast. Scones were chosen as Ireland's representative for Café Europe during the Austrian presidency of the European Union in 2006.

== Lexicology ==
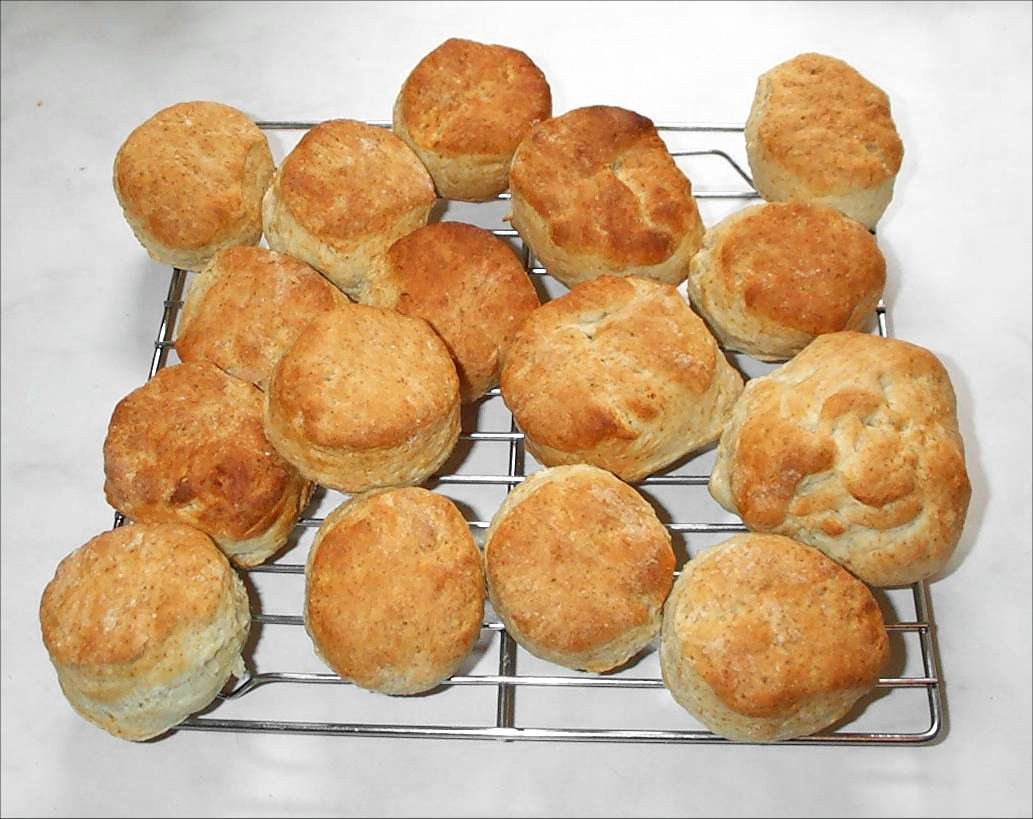
A fresh batch of homemade buttermilk scones

The pronunciation of the word within the English-speaking world varies, with some pronouncing it /skɒn/ (rhymes with "gone"), and others /skoʊn/ (rhymes with "tone"). The dominant pronunciation differs by area. Pronunciation rhyming with "tone" is strongest in the English Midlands and Ireland, though it seems to have less prominent patches in Cornwall and Essex. The pronunciation rhyming with "gone" is strongest in Northern England and Scotland, although this also seems to be the favoured pronunciation in Southern England, the Home Counties, and East Anglia. Natives of Ireland and the United States mainly use the /skoʊn/ pronunciation. British dictionaries usually show the /skɒn/ form as the preferred pronunciation, while recognising the /skoʊn/ form.

The difference in pronunciation is alluded to in a poem:

I asked the maid in dulcet tone
To order me a buttered scone;
The silly girl has been and gone
And ordered me a buttered scone.

=== Etymology ===
The origin of the word scone is obscure and may derive from several sources. The most widely accepted origin of 'scone' is the Scottish Gaelic term sgonn, meaning a large lump or mass, reflecting its original form as a rustic, hand-shaped bread, with a mention in Gavin Douglas's 1513 poem, Aeneid. Other proposed etymologies, such as Middle Dutch schoonbrood (fine white bread), are less commonly supported in linguistic studies. The Middle Low German term schöne, meaning fine bread, may also have played a role in the origination of this word.

On the other hand, Sheila MacNiven Cameron derives the word from the town of Scone (/skuːn/) (Scots: Scone, Scottish Gaelic: Sgàin) in Scotland, the ancient capital where Scottish monarchs were crowned, and on whose Stone of Scone the monarchs of the United Kingdom are still crowned today.

In regard to Griddle scones, in the Scots language and the Northumbrian English dialect, a griddle is called a girdle. The transposition of the sounds is due to linguistic metathesis.

== Bread, cake or just a scone ==
What a scone is, either a bread or a cake, is a matter of debate. The Oxford Companion to Food by Alan Davidson names the scone as a cake, which is also the description used by both the Oxford and Cambridge dictionaries. Food writers and producers have also stated it's neither a bread or a cake, as they are richer than bread, but not as rich as cake, with a texture of its own. Unlike bread, scone dough is not kneaded but lightly worked, while cake is made with a batter. The Food Standards Australia New Zealand agency classify them not as a bread or a cake, but in their own category Scones and Rock Cakes.

== History ==
During the Middle Ages, scones were piled up with biscuits to form wedding cakes. The earliest written recording of the usage of the word scone comes from 1480, when a petty customs account stated a baker, Frank Mathewe, had a small wooden chest with "400 spice cakes and 500 scone Jesus". The figure of Jesus was stamped onto baked goods at this time to show the product was made of the highest grade flour. The earliest record written recipe for a scone can be found in a folio of written recipes at the Wellcome Collection and dates from 1669. The recipe, titled "Mrs Fellard's scone cake", includes the ingredients flour, currants, eggs, sugar, a pint of ale yeast and cream. The recipe also offers alternative versions, with one being savoury with bacon and served with gravy, much like American biscuits are today. In the book A History of Scotland from the Earliest Times, it is reported that in the 17th century the poorer classes would bake "oat cakes, or the scone of bere or barley" on a griddle, while the book, History of Scotland from Robert the Bruce to the Union of the Crowns stated under James VI that the poorer people "ate brose and scarcely anything else, and the scone, the bannock, kirnmilk and the kebbuck or cheese".

When baking powder became available to the masses in 1843, the British sweetened scone that is known today first appeared. The first written recorded reference to the scone being part of the cream tea, was in The Cornishman in 1932, however it is reported that Devonians had adopted scones prior to the Cornish. Modern scones are now widely available in bakeries, convenience stores and supermarkets. A 2005 market report estimated the UK scone market to be worth £64m, showing a 9% increase over the previous five years. The increase is partly due to an increasing consumer preference for impulse and convenience foods.

Scones sold commercially are usually round, although some brands are hexagonal, as this shape may be tessellated for space efficiency. When prepared at home, they may take various shapes, including triangles, rounds and squares. Baking scones at home is often closely tied to heritage baking. They tend to be made using family recipes rather than recipe books, since it is often a family member who holds the "best" and most-treasured recipe.

In 2023, a West London woman completed a decade-long project to sample a scone at every National Trust location (244 sites across England, Wales and Northern Ireland). Scones became a staple of afternoon tea in the early 19th century, a tradition reputedly popularized by Anna, Duchess of Bedford, who introduced the practice of enjoying scones with tea as a light refreshment between meals.

== Varieties ==
British scones can be lightly sweetened or savoury. They frequently include raisins, currants, cheese or dates. Though most sweetened scones are made with self raising flour, milk, sugar and a fat (traditionally butter), British celebrity baker Mary Berry incorporates an egg into her scone dough. In Scotland and Ulster, savoury varieties of scone include soda scones, also known as soda farls, sour dough scones known as soor dook scones made with sour milk, and potato scones, normally known as tattie scones in Scotland, which resemble small, thin savoury pancakes made with potato flour. Potato scones, also known as Potato Farls or Potato Cakes, are most commonly served fried in a full Scottish breakfast or an Ulster fry.

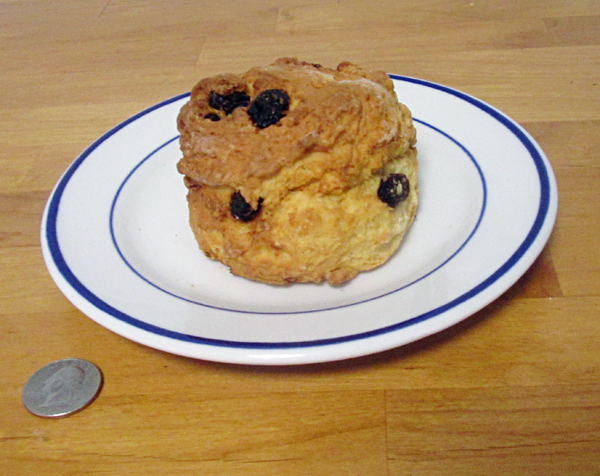
An Irish scone with sultanas

The Griddle scone (most dialects of English), which are also known as girdle scone (Scots and Northumbrian English), Drop Scones (Scots), and as a Singin' Hinnie (Northumbrian English) is a variety of scone which is baked on a griddle or frying pan rather than in an oven. In New Zealand, griddle scones are generally cooked as one large disk shaped mass which is divided into wedges for serving, often with golden syrup or jam.

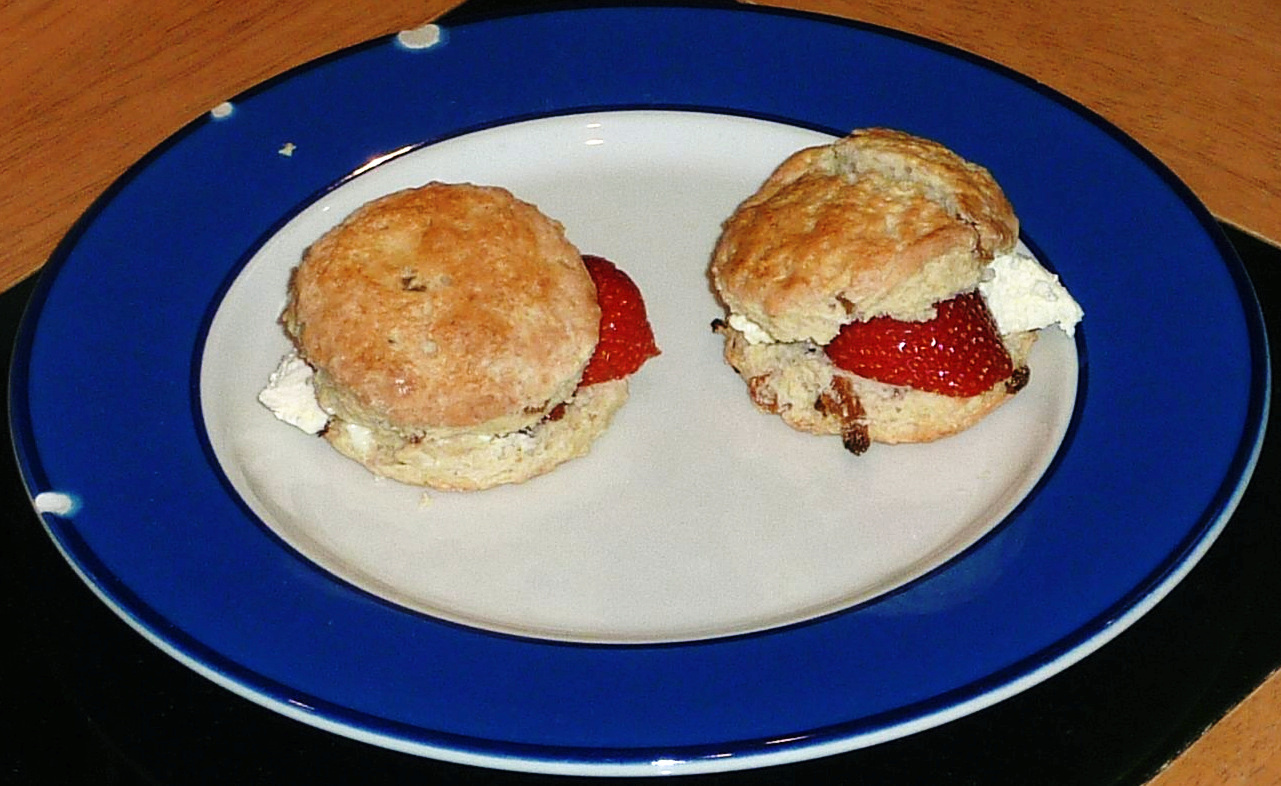
Scone with cream and strawberries

Other varieties include the lemonade scone, which is made with clear lemonade and cream instead of butter and milk. The fruit scone or fruited scone contains currants, sultanas, peel and glacé cherries mixed into the dough.

In some countries one may also encounter savoury varieties of scone that may contain or be topped with combinations of cheese or bacon.

Scones can be presented with various toppings and condiments, typically butter, jam and cream. Strawberries are also sometimes used.

== International variations ==
=== Australia ===
Pumpkin scones, made by adding mashed cooked pumpkin to the dough mixture, had increased exposure during the period when Florence Bjelke-Petersen was in the public eye. Date scones, which contain chopped dried dates, can also be found in Australia. Another old style of cooking scones, generally in the colder months, is to deep-fry or pan-fry them in dripping or oil; prepared this way, they are called "puftaloons".

=== Canada ===
Scones of both British and American varieties are popular across Canada.

In Newfoundland and Labrador, American scones exist there as a very similar baked goods known as a "tea bun". Tea bun recipes often include evaporated milk and may be either sweet or savoury, frequently containing raisins, blueberries, lingonberries, molasses, crowberries, coconut, or salted pork. As the name suggests, tea buns are typically consumed alongside tea and may be topped with butter or various berry jams.

=== Hungary ===
In Hungary, a scone very similar in appearance to the British version exists under the name "pogácsa", although this is made with yeast and not baking powder. The name has been adopted by several neighbouring nations' languages. Pogácsa is almost always savoury and served with varied seasonings and toppings, like dill and cheese.

=== New Zealand ===
Scones make up a part of kiwiana, and are among the most popular recipes in the Edmonds Cookery Book, New Zealand's best-selling cook book. The Edmonds recipe is unsweetened, using only flour, baking powder, salt, butter and milk. Other ingredients such as cheese, sultanas and dates can be added.

Cheese scones are a popular snack sold in cafes or tea shops, where they are commonly served toasted with butter.

=== South Africa ===
Scones are commonly served with cream and jam; grated cheddar cheese is another popular accompaniment.

=== South America ===
Scones are quite popular in Argentina as well as Uruguay. They were brought there by Irish, English and Scottish immigrants and by Welsh immigrants in Patagonia (Britons are the third largest foreign community in Argentina). They are different in texture to British scones, and are usually accompanied by tea, coffee or mate, or as part of Merienda, an Argentinian afternoon tea.

=== United States ===
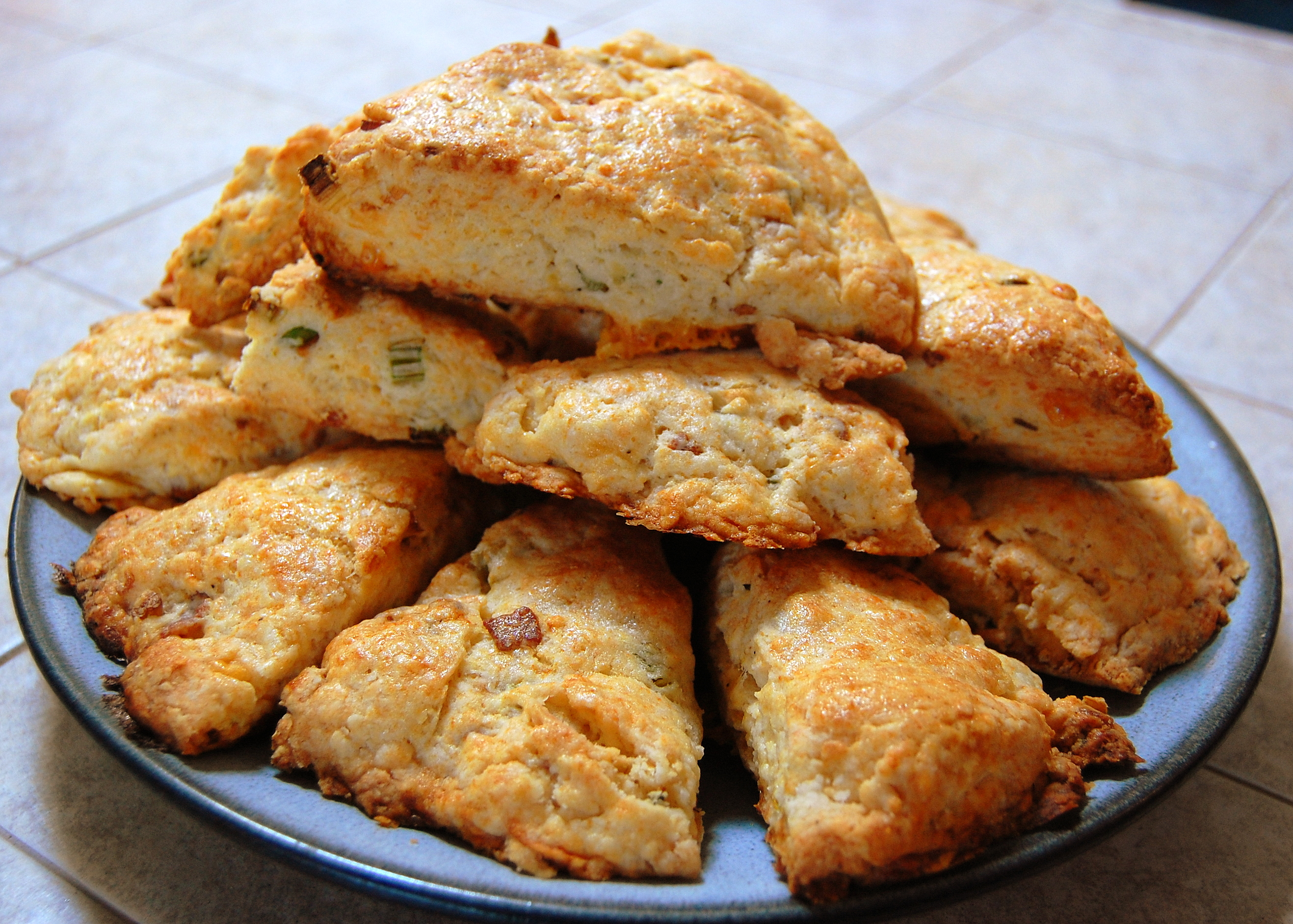
American scones

Unlike British scones, which are lighter and traditionally served with clotted cream and jam, American scones are denser contain more butter and sugar, making them richer and intended to be eaten on their own. They are usually triangular, and often contain fruit such as blueberries or sultanas, or such flavourings as pumpkin, cinnamon or chocolate chips. They may also be topped with icing. They are often eaten as they are (not topped with butter, jam or cream), along with coffee or tea, and often appear in US coffee houses. American biscuits are similar to traditional British scones, but are usually savoury and served with savoury meals. Cobbler batter is also similar to the traditional British scones mixture.

In Idaho and Utah, the bread products locally called "scones" are similar to Native American frybread or New Orleans beignets and are made from a sweet yeast dough, with buttermilk and baking powder or soda added, and they are fried rather than baked. They are customarily served with butter and either honey or maple syrup.

=== Zimbabwe ===
In Zimbabwe scones are popular and often eaten for breakfast with English tea, jam and clotted cream. Originally brought to the country during its period of British colonial rule, the scone is sometimes seen as symbolic of the country's historic link to the UK that has become Zimbabweanified.

== See also ==
- Cream tea
- Croissant
- Cruffin
- Crumpet
- Doughnut
- Mantecada
- Muffin
