= Kolach =

Kolach is the Slavonic term for a number of traditional baked products, such as:

- Kolach (bread), a circular bread, most often made as a sweet dish
- Slavski kolač, a Serbian variant of the kolach, made for the celebration of Slava
- Kolach (cake), a Czech and Slovak sweet pastry different from the above
- Klobasnek, a savory bread known as kolache in Texas

== See also ==
- Korovai
- Kolatch, people with this surname
