= Slavski kolač =

Serbian celebration bread

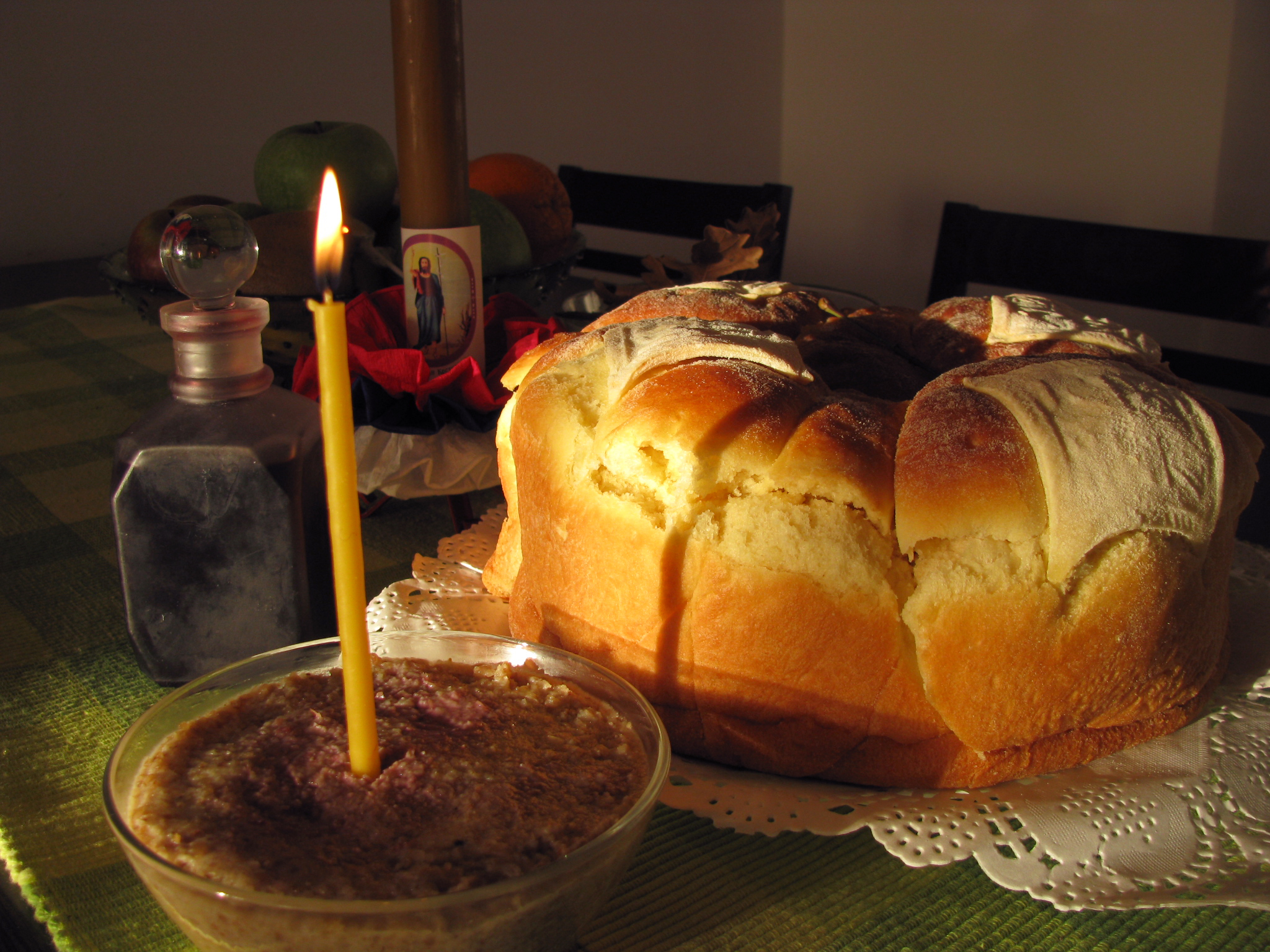
Slavski kolač with candle, grain and wine

Slavski kolač (Serbian Cyrillic: славски колач) is a traditional Serbian ritual bread (a type of yeast leavened bread). It is made for the Orthodox Christian celebration of Slava, a UNESCO's Representative List of the Intangible Cultural Heritage of Humanity. The parish priest visits the family to consecrate the kolač and red wine, and to light a beeswax candle stamped with an image of the saint.

Often extended family and friends are invited to the celebration. Wine is poured over the cake, and it is cut or broken by members of the family before lunch.

== Significance ==
The custom of Slava and the importance of the celebration cake are found only among Serbs. It celebrates home liturgy, domesticity, family gatherings, and family tradition. Slavski kolač, along with the candle and a wheat dish such as žito (koljivo), are present at all Slava celebrations and are considered the crucial elements.

The cake symbolizes of the body of Jesus, and the wine with which the cake is eaten represents his blood. Traditionally a woman made the bread the day before the celebration, after bathing, dressing in clean clothing, saying the Lord's Prayer, and crossing herself. Tradition calls for the dough to be made with consecrated water.

During the coronavirus pandemic, health authorities advised that it was not necessary to take the cake to church, that singing was not necessary for the celebration, and that the gatherings should be limited to household members.

== Description ==
The kolač is a round yeast breadlike cake approximately 15 centimetres (6 in) high. Traditionally, braided dough is wrapped around the rim and a dough cross is pressed into the center of the dough, dividing the loaf into quarters. Each quarter gets further decoration, such a Cyrillic "C", which stands for samo, sloga, Srbina, spasava, meaning "Only unity will save the Serbs". Around the rim the letters "ИС ХС НИ КА" (Cyrillic), an abbreviation for "Jesus Christ Conquers". Every baker has her own style of decoration.

== Consecration ==
The parish priest visits the family to consecrate the kolač and red wine, and to light a beeswax candle stamped with an image of the saint. Some families instead take the cake to church to be consecrated.

After the cake is consecrated, wine is poured over the cake. The woman of the household cuts it into quarters and turns it cut-side up. It is further cut into pieces by other family members and oldest or most important guests.

== Gallery ==
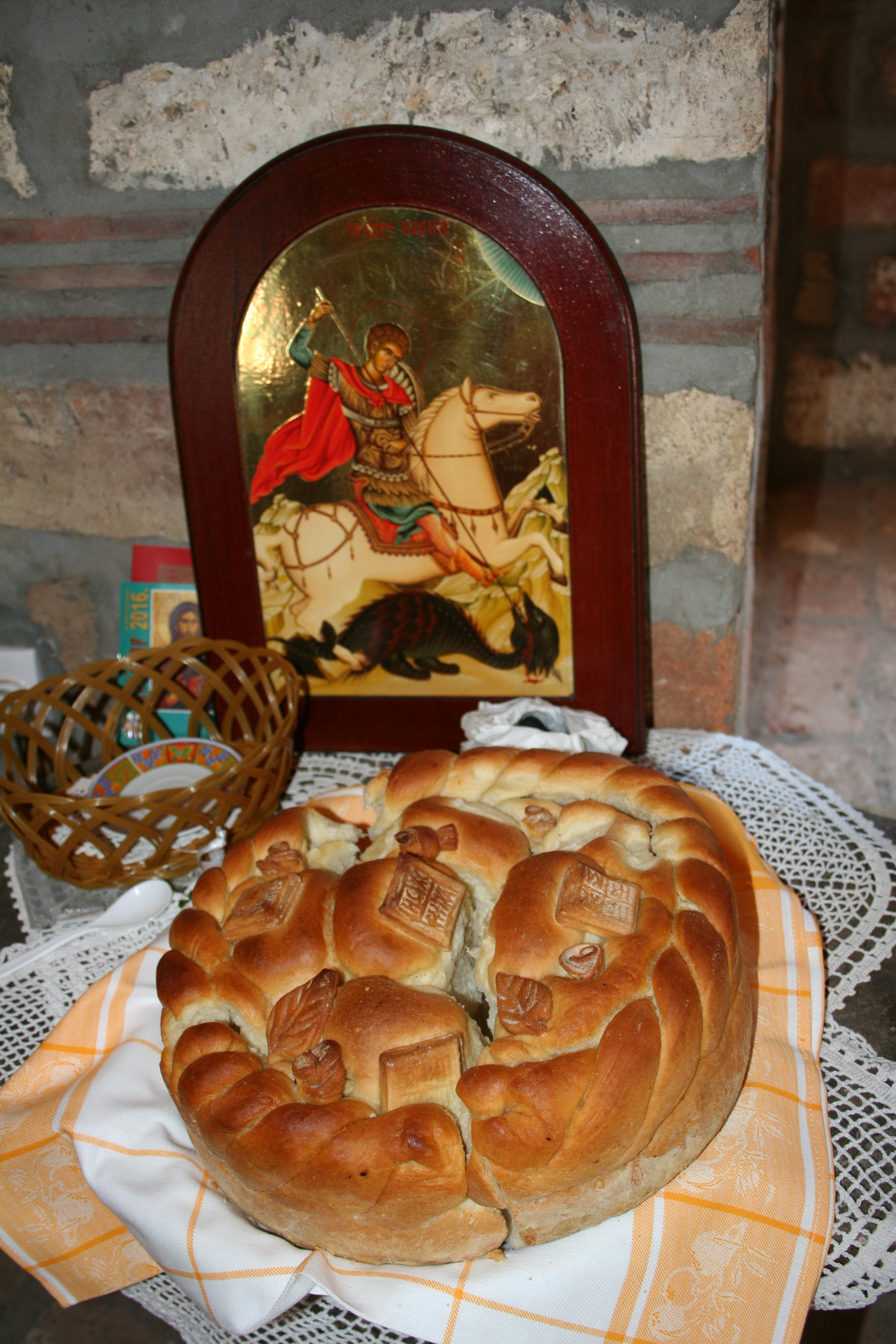
Slavski kolač in the Saint John of Shanghai Church on Cer

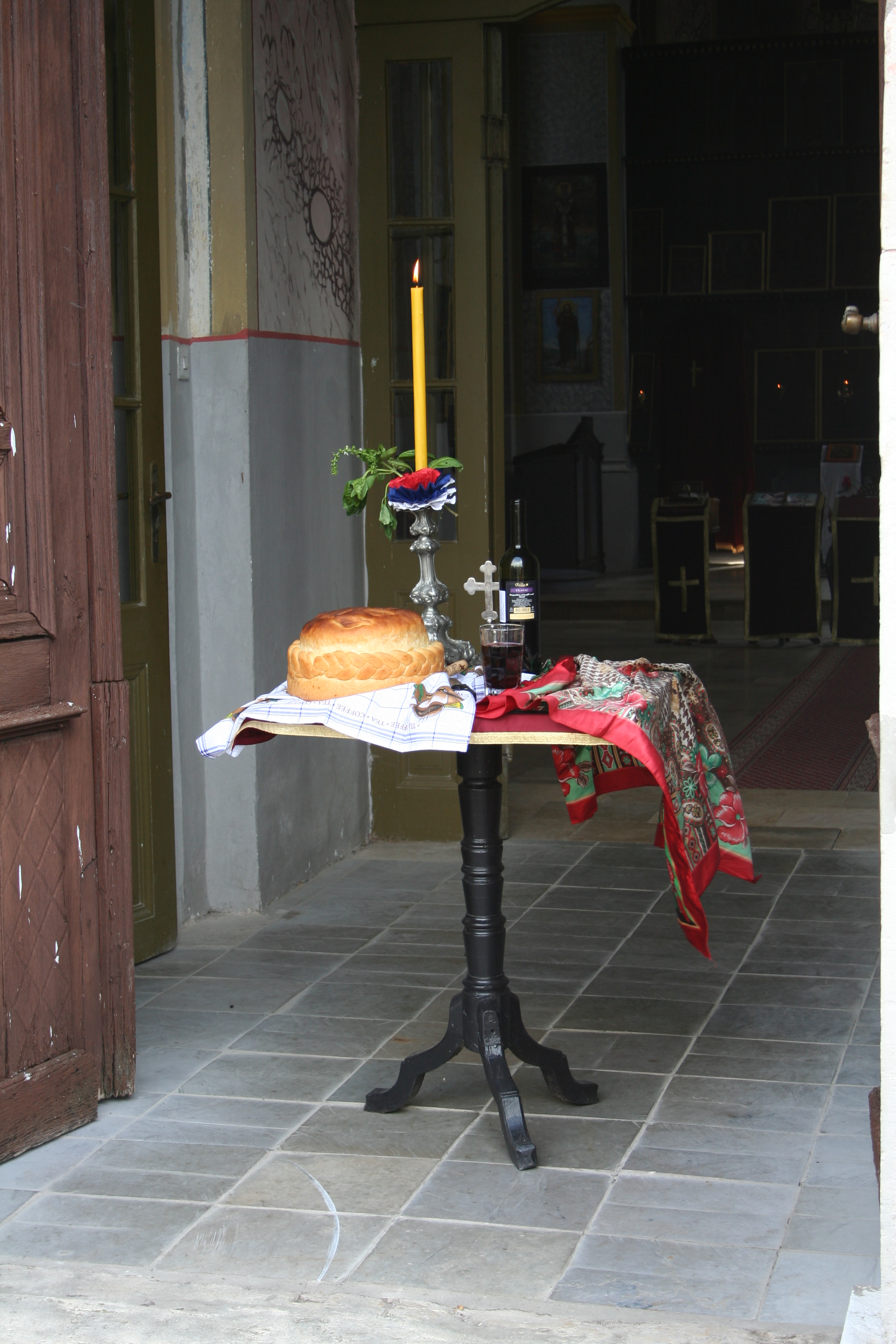
Slavski kolač in the Saint John the Baptist Church in Nakučani

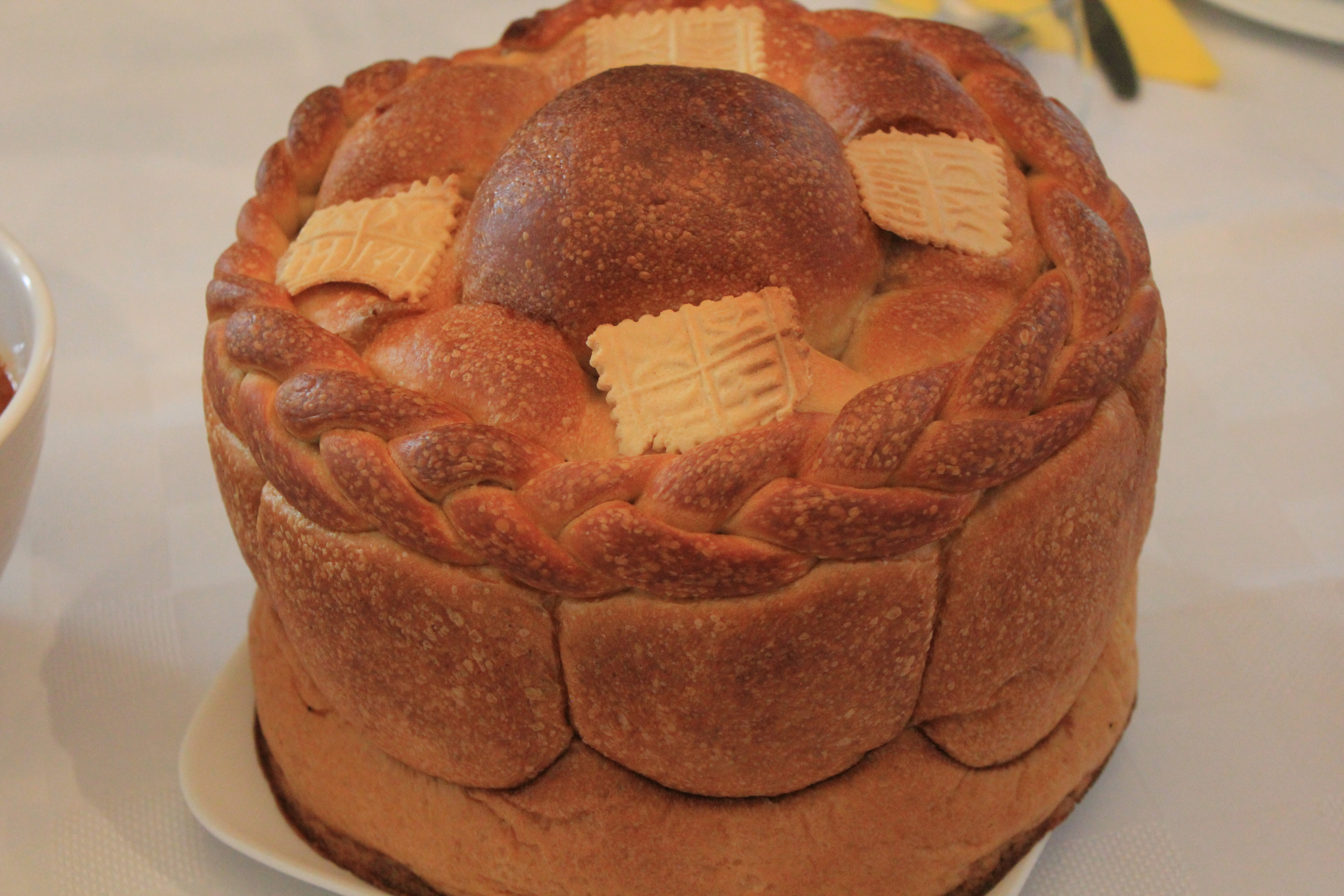
Slavski kolač

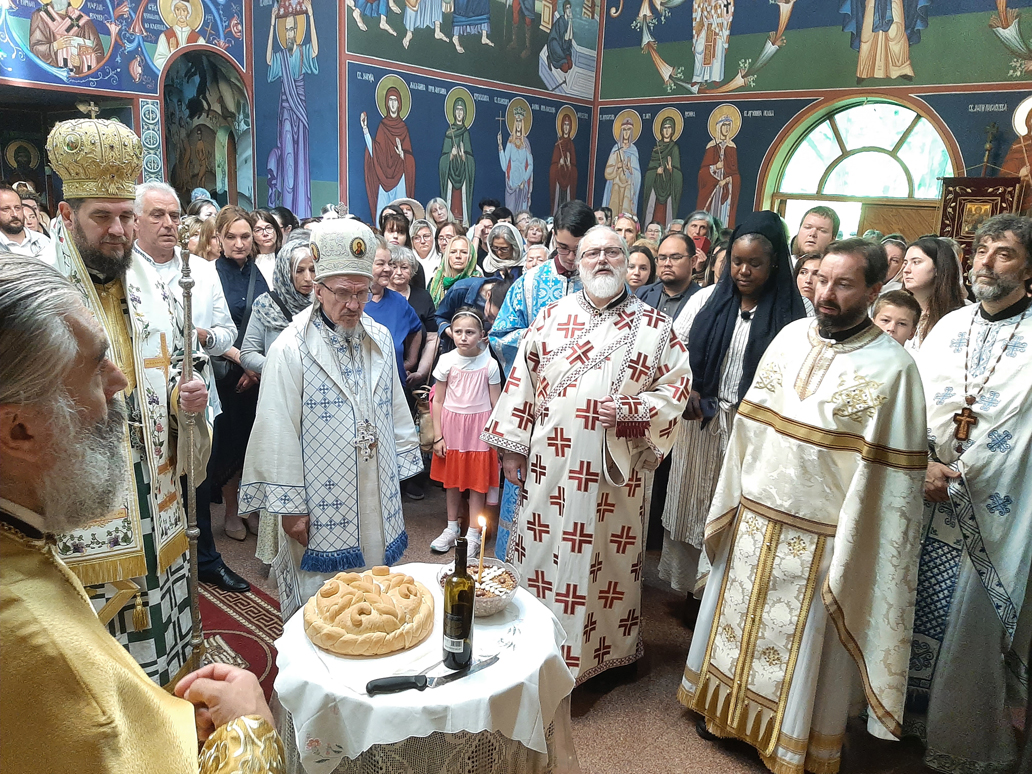
Blessing of the Slavski kolač at the Holy Transfiguration Monastery in Milton

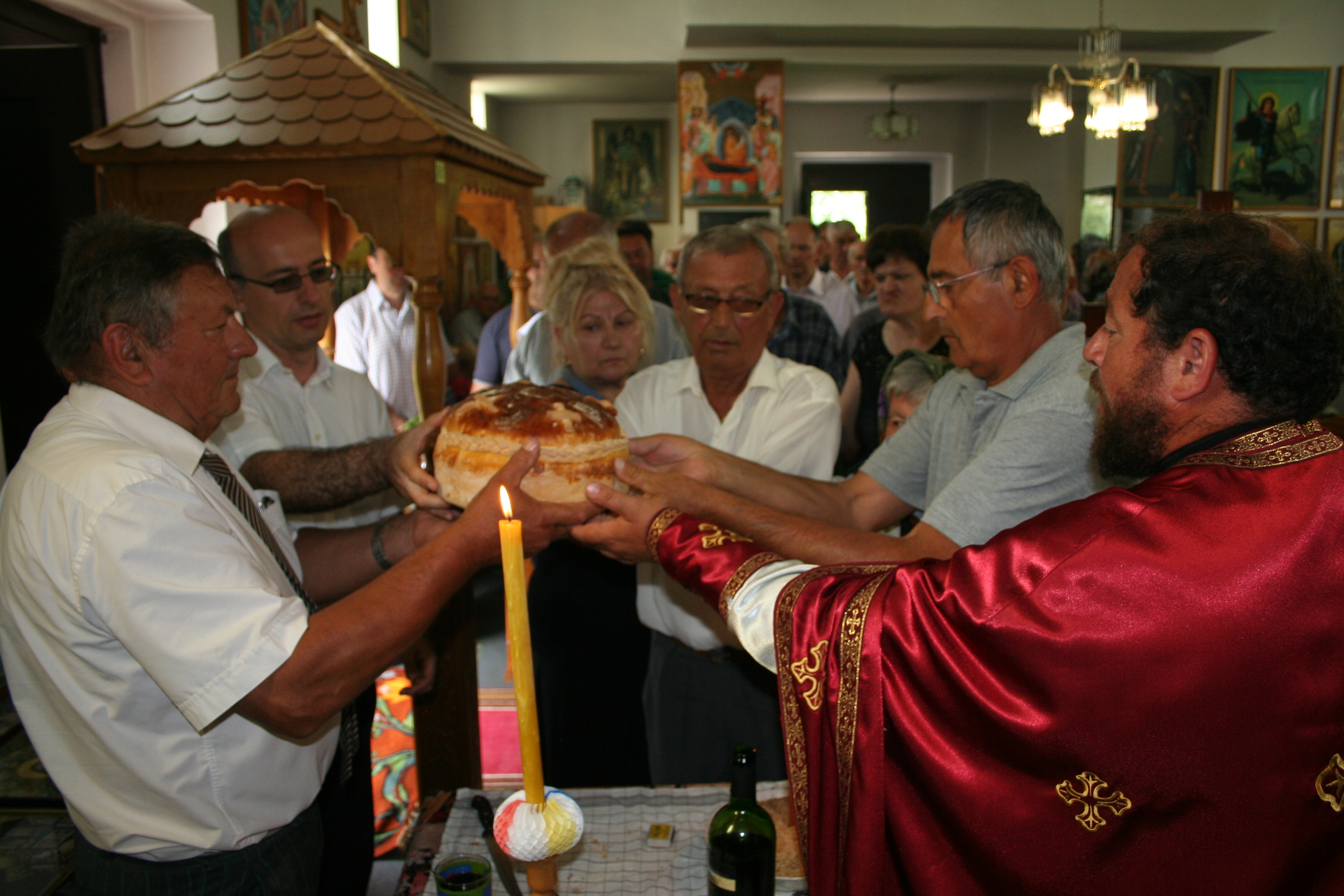
Breaking of the Slavski kolač at the Holy Trinity Church in Lojanice

== See also ==
- Patron saint day
- Kolach (bread)
- Korovai
