= Kolach (bread) =

Eastern European bread

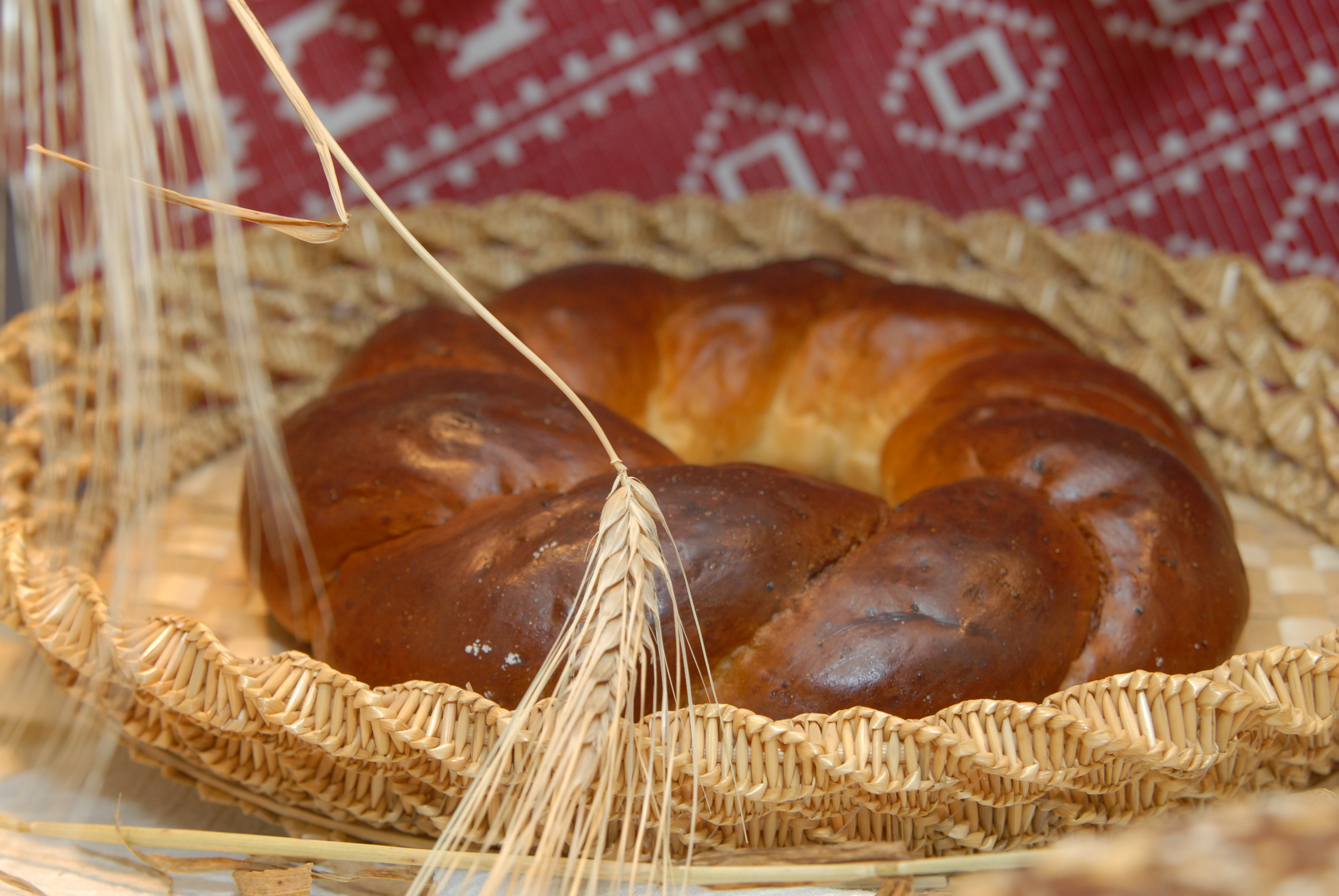
- Alternative names: Kalach, Kulaç, Korovai, Karavai
- Type: Sweet or savoury bread, ceremonial cake
- Place of origin: Eastern Europe
- Region or state: Albania, Belarus, Bulgaria, Hungary, Moldova, North Macedonia, Poland, Romania, Russia, Serbia, Ukraine
- Created by: Early Slavs
- Main ingredients: Wheat or rye flour

A kolach or kalach is a traditional bread found in Central and Eastern European cuisines, commonly served during various special occasions – particularly wedding celebrations, Christmas, Easter, and Dożynki. The name originates from the Old Slavonic word kolo (коло) meaning "circle" or "wheel". Korovai is sometimes categorised as a type of kolach.

== Etymology ==
The name slightly varies between countries, but its general meaning originally comes from the Early Slavic root vocabulary that references the circular shape of the bread (Proto-Slavic: *kolačь, derived from "kolo"). Variants of "kolach" (Bulgarian, Macedonian, and Ukrainian: колач, Polish: kołacz, Silesian: kołocz, Romanian: colac, Serbian: колач / kolač, Slovene: kolač) are the most commonly used forms, but "kalach" (Belarusian, Russian, and Ukrainian: калач, Hungarian: kalács) is also widespread. The Albanian: kulaç is cognate with all of these.

The nouns "korovai" (Polish: korowaj, Serbian: коровај, Ukrainian: коровай), "karavai" (Belarusian: каравай, Russian: каравай), and "kravai" (Bulgarian: кравай) are not etymologically related to "kolach", but are used as names for a very similar type of bread, one that can be savoury or sweet; in some countries, such as Poland, korowaj is considered simply a more decorative type of kolach and thus used interchangeably with kołacz.

The names Czech: koláč and Slovak: koláč, although of the same origin as "kolach", refer to another pastry—the differently shaped cake kolach as opposed to the sweet bread. In Poland and Serbia kołacz and kolač respectively are also used as the name for different types of cakes.

== Traditions by country ==
Kolach and korovai pastries, as well as the customs associated with them and the way they are made, share some similarities (especially across the Slavonic nations), but various differences exist between countries and even regions within each country.

=== Belarus ===
Just like in neighbouring Ukraine and Poland, the kolach remains an important element of rural celebrations in Belarus (especially at weddings) where it is known as "калач" and "кравай". The kalach represents hospitality, future prosperity, and respect; it is often decorated with various figurines and symbolic flags. Usually served savoury, the kravai is sometimes dipped in salt.

=== Hungary ===
The Hungarian kalács (pronounced [ˈkɒlaːtʃ]) is a sweet bread very similar to brioche, usually baked in a braided form, and traditionally considered an Easter food. Until the end of the 19th century, the preparation of kalács was similar to that of everyday bread; the difference was in the shape, and in the better/quality flour used for the kalács. Nowadays kalács is prepared from dough enriched with milk and eggs. It is baked in an oven or brick oven, sometimes directly on the stones of the brick oven, or on a baking sheet.

Kalács is part of the traditional Easter menu in Hungary, often consecrated together with ham in Catholic churches. Kalácskoszorú is the circular form of the kalács is most commonly made for Easter. Another version is also the kalács-kifli. Kalács is also common inside a komatál, a traditional gift plate, given to someone as a gesture of friendship. In the Szeged region at All Saints unfilled kalács was baked called All Saints' Kalács (mindenszentek kalácsa, kolduskalács = Beggar's Kalács), which was given to beggars at the gate of the graveyard. Also kalács was given to beggars praying at the graveyard's gate in Csallóköz to prevent the dead from returning. Giving kalács to beggars is the Christian form of the pagan tradition of treating the dead.

=== Poland ===
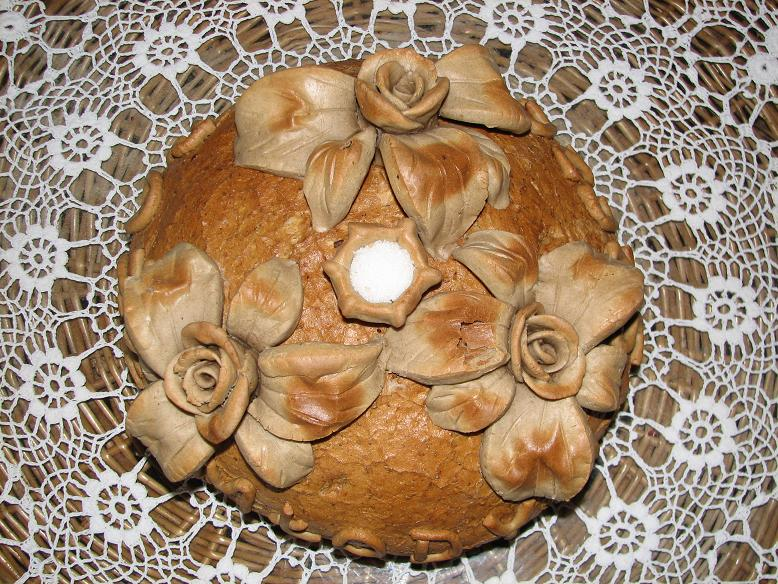
Lavish korowaj "bread and salt" variant of kolach at a Polish wedding

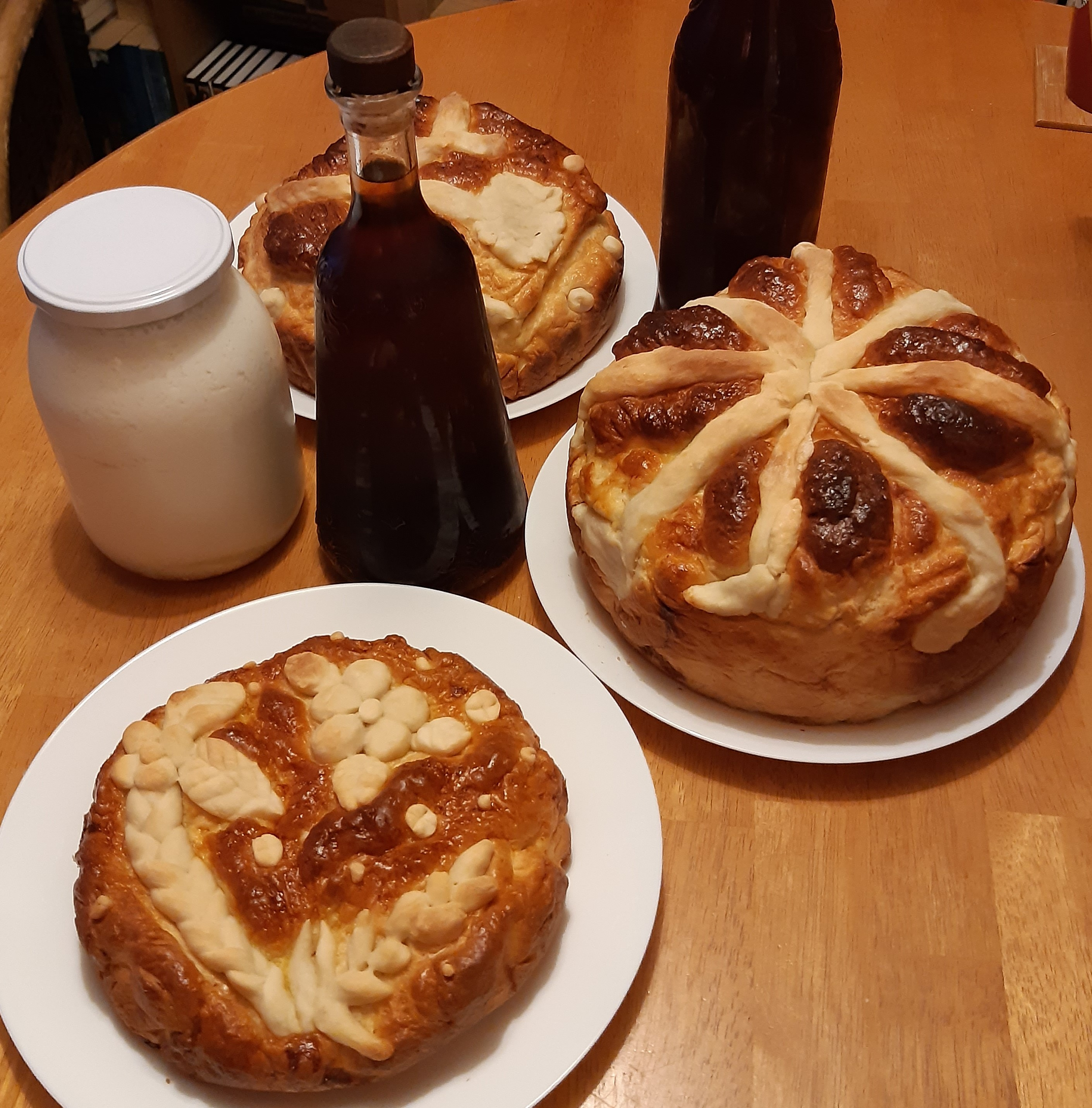
Polish kołacz and korovai served alongside kvass and kefir

According to Sophie Hodorowicz Knab, the first known documented record of a special bread called kołacz or korowaj being served at Polish weddings (though today it can also be made for Dożynki, Christmas or Easter) dates back to the start of the 13th century, when it was already a well-known tradition on Polish lands; it was also mentioned by Zorian Dołęga-Chodakowski in his 1818 paper O Sławiańszczyźnie przed chrześcijaństwem and by Władysław Reymont in his Nobel Prize-winning novel Chłopi.

Ethnographic studies from the years 1970–1982 and 2003 showed that the custom of making kołacze (Polish plural of kołacz) survived, particularly in rural areas, throughout many regions of Poland; however, the specifics – such as whether the pastry was prepared at the house of the bride or that of the groom – varied across towns and villages. Some kolache come with fillings, such as white cheese and poppyseed, raisins, millet kasha and dried plum; sometimes they are topped with powdered sugar or poppyseeds. Although not always so, kołacz is often decorated (especially when served on special occasions), whereas korowaj practically always refers to an even more lavish type of kolach with common motifs like a bird's nest in the middle surrounded by braids, ears of grain, birds, conifer cones, roses, floral patterns, etc.

In 1900-1903, Zygmunt Gloger wrote that the Polish kolach came in many diverse variants, most often made using wheat or rye flour, and he shared the view that the name kołacz and rituals associated with the bread bearing this title had older roots shared across all Slavonic peoples. Within the Polish context, Gloger spoke of an ancient Slavic version of the kolach tradition that was for a long time preserved among the szlachta (Polish nobility) who laid out the kołacze onto the table and the ladies gathered would then begin singing, clapping their hands, and rapidly dancing in front of the presented baked goods. Numerous regional types of sweet bread named kołacz or korowaj have been registered within the database of Poland's Ministry of Agriculture and Rural Development. The Ministry writes that the custom of kolach/korovai making has been present in present-day eastern Poland (particularly in Podlachia, Suwałki Region, Lublin Voivodeship, Mazovia) since the Middle Ages and is also celebrated by Serbs, Bulgarians, Ukrainians, and Belarusians.

Various sayings and rhymes about the kolach have also entered the Polish language and culture over the centuries that it was baked, showing the importance of this sweet bread and the rituals surrounding it as an ancient tradition of the Polish nation as well as among the Rusyn minority that has inhabited parts of Poland throughout its history. In some parts of Silesia, the kolach is known as kołocz instead and made to celebrate other holidays (such as Dożynki) as well as being baked for weddings. The Armenian communities and their descendants, who have been an important part of Polish society since at least the 14th century, also cultivate the tradition of kolach as a holiday pastry but with the addition of saffron as an ingredient.

=== Romania and Moldova ===
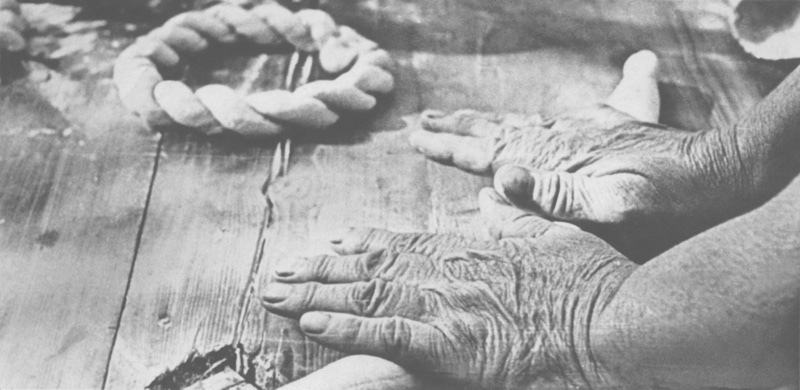
Making colaci in Moldova

The traditional Romanian and Moldovan colac is a braided bread, typically made for special occasions or holidays, such as Christmas, Easter, weddings, and funerals. It is a traditional custom of Romanian rural society, on Christmas Eve, to gather in groups, to go in different houses and to sing colinde, traditional Christmas carols. In some villages, they go first to the mayor's house, followed by the teacher's house, whereas in other parts there is no pre-established order. The families would then invite them into the house, and give them different small gifts such as nuts, dried fruits, and colacs.

The word colac (plural colaci) came from Slavic kolač and ultimately from Proto-Slavic kolo ("circle", "wheel") referring to the circular form. The word may be cognate with challah (Hebrew: חלה, romanized: ḥallah) and Greek κολλιξ.

=== Russia ===
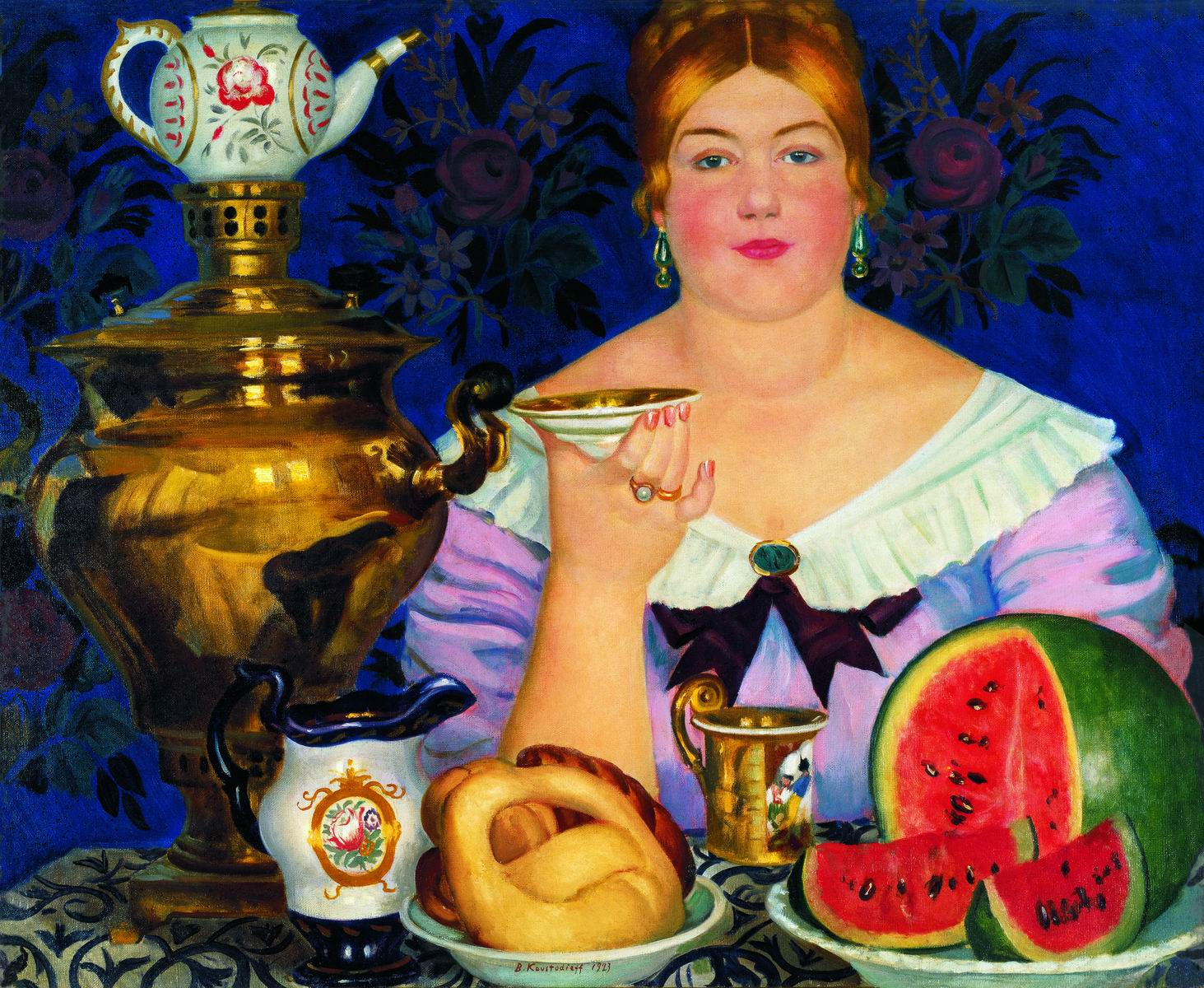
Boris Kustodiev. A merchant's wife drinking tea, 1923, depicts a kalach in the form of a kettlebell.

In modern Russian, kalach refers to a specific type of twisted white bread. Historically, kalach meant any kind of white bread, and before modern methods of grinding wheat came into use, white bread was classed as a type of fancy bread.

Kalach usually looks like a circle, but one part of it is significantly thinner, and the other is significantly thicker. The traditional explanation is that the thinner part was used as a "handle" so kalach could be eaten even by workers who had no time to wash their hands. After eating, the handle was thrown away or given to the poor. Because only desperate people ate the handles that had been thrown away, this is thought to be the origin of the Russian saying "go down to the handle" (дойти до ручки, doyti do ruchki) meaning to experience a profound setback, to hit rock bottom.

A man who made kalaches was called a kalachnik (калачник), which sometimes became kalashnik (калашник) due to the sandhi effect. Such a man's descendants might be given the surname Kalachnikov (Калачников) or Kalashnikov (Калашников, "[son] of the kalach-maker").

=== Serbia ===
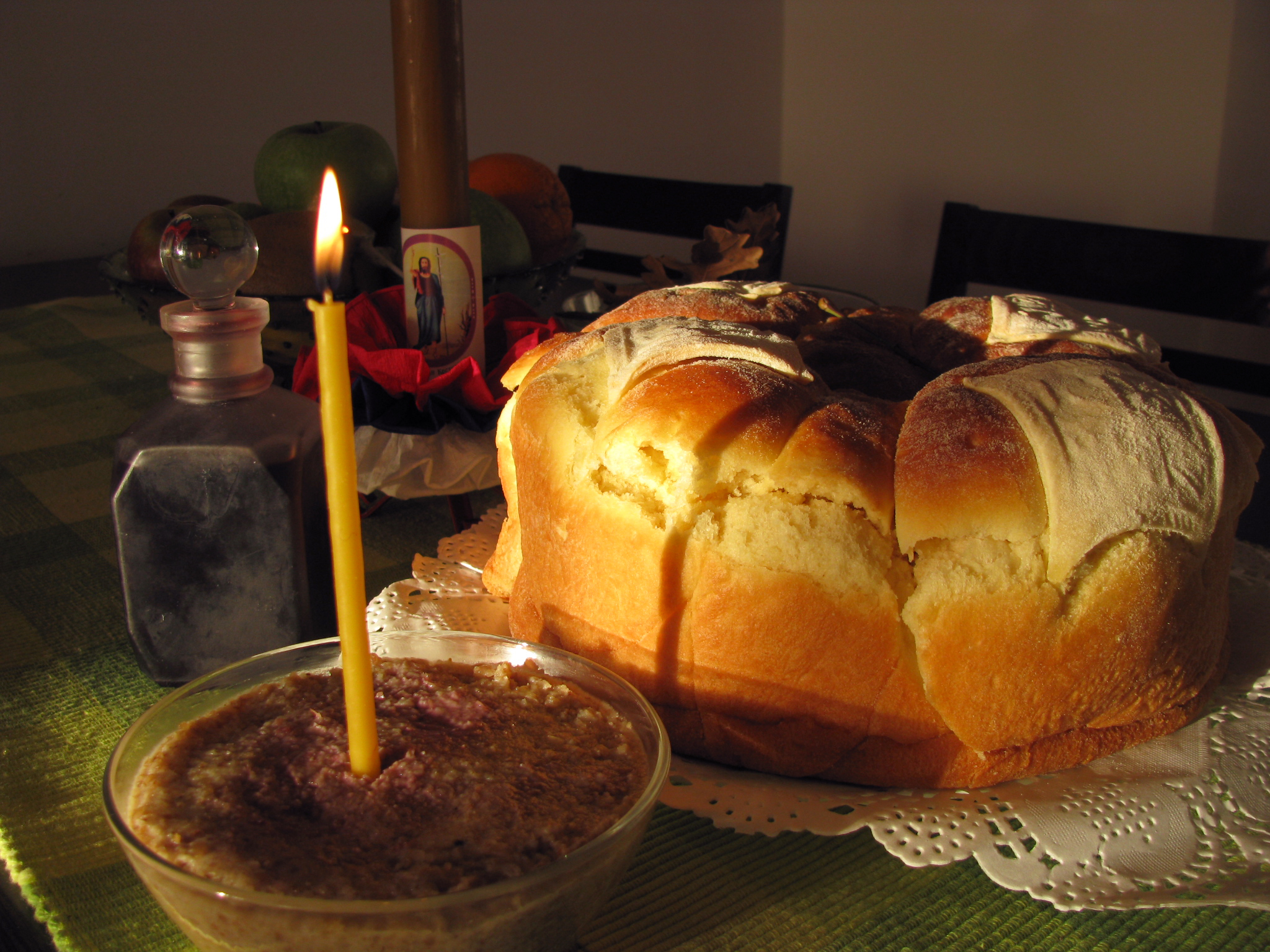
Slavski kolač with candle, grain, and wine

In Serbia, the kolač (as the kolach is known there) is a traditional yeast bread generally considered a cake. As opposed to the welcoming and wedding ceremonies of Poland and some other Slavic countries, in Serbia the custom of baking and consuming kolach is used solely for the purpose of the Orthodox Christian celebration of Slava—hence the name Slavski kolač. The parish priest visits the family to consecrate the kolač and red wine, and to light a beeswax candle stamped with an image of the family's patron saint.

The Slavski kolač is a round, yeast, bread cake approximately 15 centimetres (6 in) high. Traditionally, braided dough is wrapped around the rim and a dough cross is pressed into the centre of the dough, dividing the loaf into quarters. Each quarter gets further decoration, such as a Cyrillic "C", which stands for samo sloga Srbina spasava meaning "only unity will save the Serbs". Around the rim Cyrillic letters "ИС ХС НИ КА" are placed, an abbreviation for "Jesus Christ Conquers". Every baker has their own style of decoration.

=== Ukraine ===
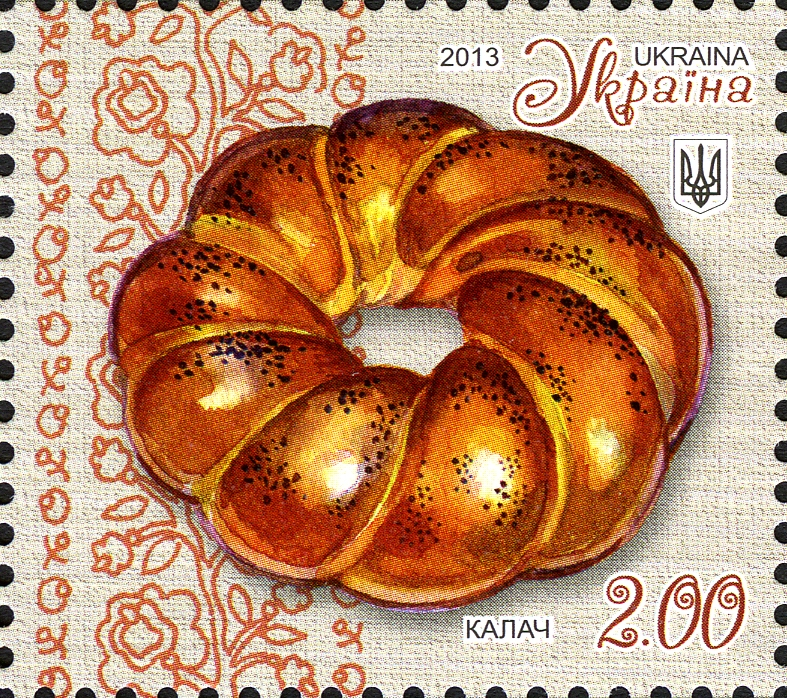
Ukrainian postage stamp from 2013 with kolach

Ukrainian kolaches are made by braiding dough made with wheat flour into ring-shaped or oblong forms. They are a symbol of luck, prosperity, and good bounty, and are traditionally prepared for Svyat Vechir (Holy Supper), the Ukrainian Christmas Eve ritual, for births, baptisms and for funerals.

For Christmas kolach three braided loaves of varied sizes are stacked representing the Trinity. The bread's circular shape symbolizes eternity. When served as part of Christmas dinner, a candle is placed in the centre of the intricately braided loaves, but the bread cannot be eaten until Christmas Day because observance of the Advent fasting requires abstaining from eggs until midnight on Christmas Eve.

For funerals, the loaves are brought to church for Divine Liturgy to be blessed and then served in slices with fresh fruit as a symbol of the good the deceased did in their lifetime. Exact customs vary but as an example the three loaves are decorated with three apples, three oranges, and grapes, with a candle placed in the centre. Sometimes a small individual loaf is given.

In the area around Kyiv, it was custom for a midwife to give a kolach as a gift to parents, as part of a fertility blessing. Kalaches were also used in funeral ceremonies. As well in Galicia and Bukovina they were given by children to their godparents in ceremony called a kolachyny (кола́чини) or kolachannya (кола́чання).

The Bread Museum in L'viv, Ukraine, contains many examples of intricately woven kalach, paska, and babka.

== See also ==
- Challah, Jewish braided bread
- Slavski kolač, a Serbian orthodox bread
- Covrigi
- Kolache, Czech pastry
- Korovai, another Slavic braided bread
