= Kolatch =

Kolatch is a surname. Notable people with the surname include:

- Alfred J. Kolatch (1916–2007), American rabbi, author and publisher
- Myron Kolatch (born 1929), American magazine editor

== See also ==
- Kolach (disambiguation)
