= Dożynki =

Slavic harvest festival

Dozhynki
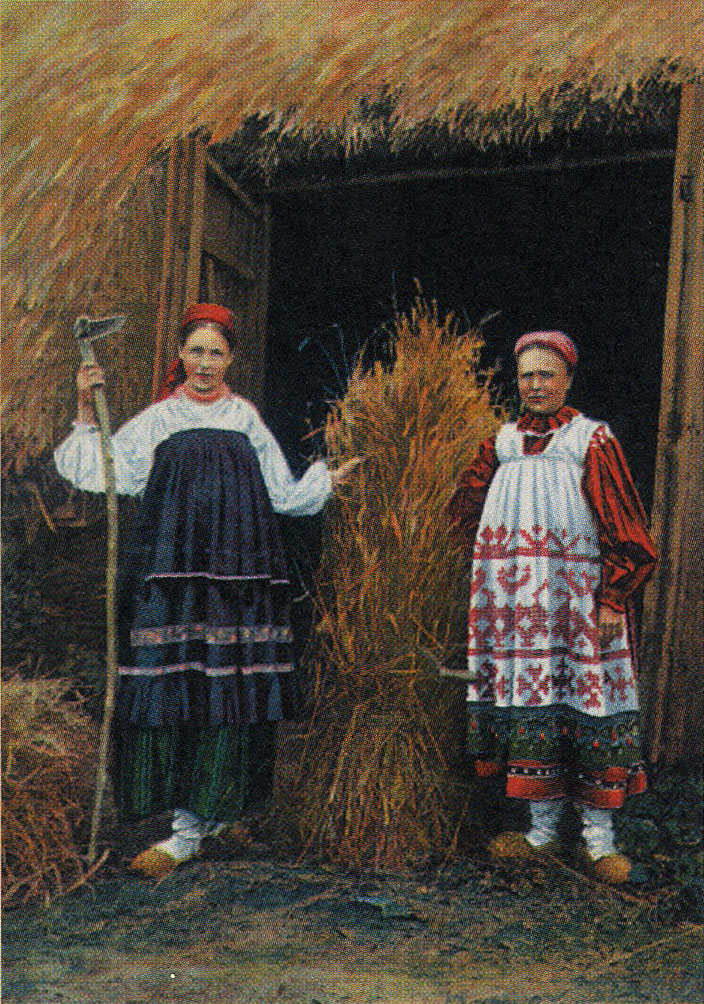
- Last sheaf. Russia. Photos of the early 20th century
- Also called: Russian: Обжинки, romanized: Obzhynki; Polish: Dożynki; Belarusian: Прачыстая, Prachystaya; Czech: Dožínky; Kashubian: Òżniwinë; Dormition
- Observed by: Slavic people
- Significance: The end of the harvest crops
- Date: Varies by region; August 15 (28); in Poland: 23 September; In some regions of Russia: September 8 (21) or September 14 (27).

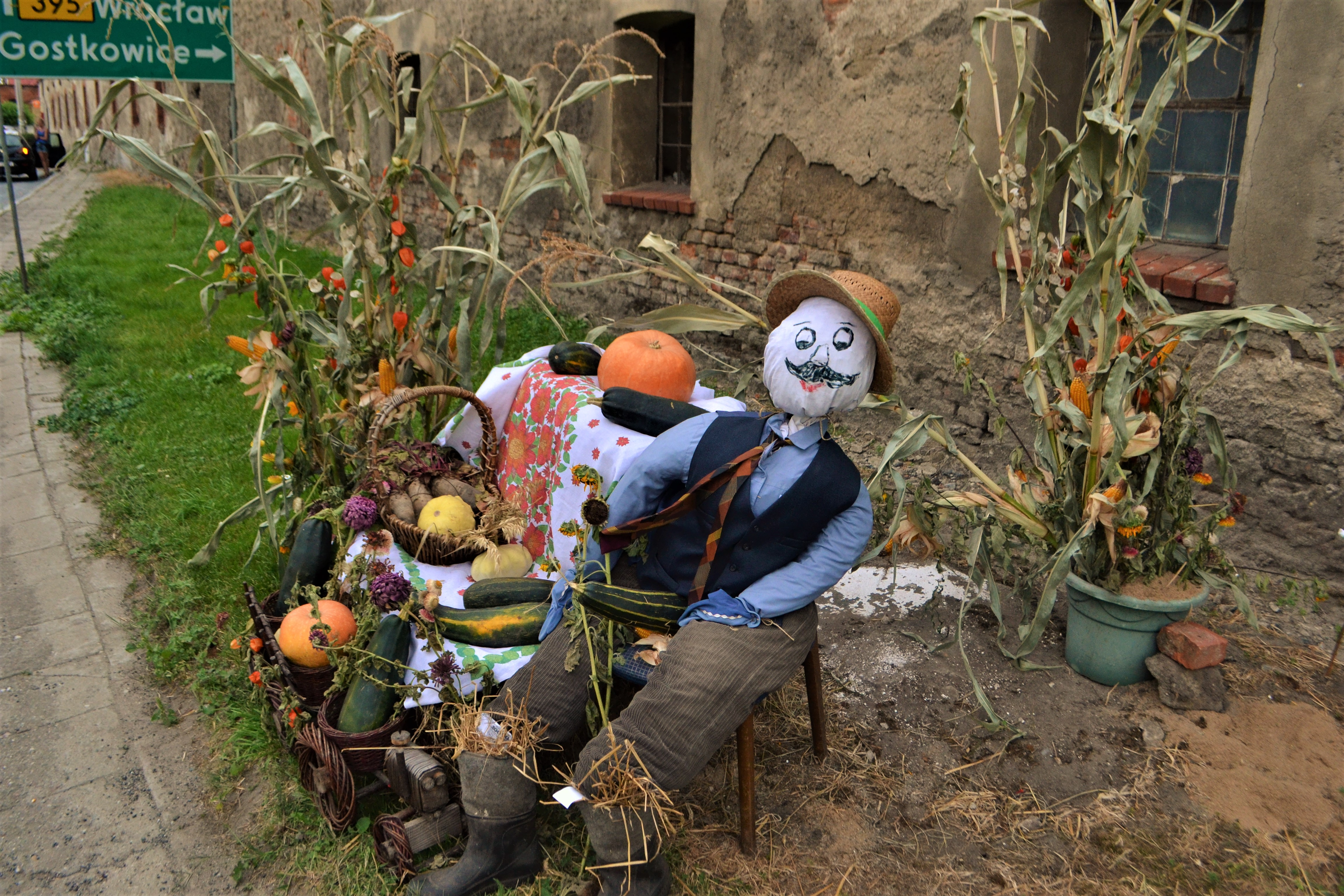
Side road effigy during Dożynki festival near Wrocław

Dożynki (Dozhinki, Ukrainian: Обжинки, romanized: Obzhynky, Polish: Dożynki [dɔˈʐɘŋki], Russian: Обжинки, romanized: Obzhynki; Belarusian: Дажынкі, romanized: Dažynki, Prachystaya; Czech: Dožínky, Obžinky; Kashubian: Òżniwinë; Dormition) is a Slavic harvest festival. In pre-Christian times the feast usually fell on the autumn equinox, in modern times it is usually celebrated on one of the Sundays following the end of the harvest season, which fall on different days in different regions of Europe.

The feast was initially associated with the pagan Slavic cult of plants, trees and agriculture. In the 16th century in Central and Eastern Europe it gained a Christian character and started to be organised by the landed gentry and more affluent peasants as a means to thank the reapers and their families for their work, both during the harvest and during the past year.

While there are many regional varieties and traditions, most have some aspects in common. Often the peasants or farmers celebrating dożynki gather in the fields outside their village, form a procession and bring back a sheaf or the last batch of cereal reaped from nearby fields. The women would then turn it into a wreath and offer it to the guest of honour (usually the organiser of the celebration: a local noble, the richest farmer in the village or – in modern times – the wójt or other representative of the authorities).

== Names ==
In Poland, where the tradition survived to modern times, the feast and accompanying rituals are known under a variety of names depending on the region. The prevalent term is dożynki, but wyżynki, obrzynki, wieniec, wieńcowe, żniwniok or okrężne are also used in some areas.

The word dożynki and the cognates is a noun from the verb dożynać, 'to complete the reaping'.

Similarly, in Belarus there are a variety of names in use, including the Feast of the Most Pure One (Belarusian: Першая Прачыстая), Aspazha (Belarusian: Аспажа), Haspazha (Belarusian: Гаспажа), Great Spazha (Belarusian: Вялікая Спажа), Zelnya (Belarusian: Зельная), Talaka (Belarusian: Талака) and Dazhynki (Belarusian: Дажынкі). In Belarusian culture it is often associated and intermixed with the feasts of the Assumption of Mary (often dubbed the feast of the Mother of God of the Herbs in both Polish and Belarusian), hence the names of Green Feast (Belarusian: Зялёная) and Dormition (Belarusian: Успленье) are also used.

== History ==
As with many other Slavic feasts and rites, the origins of Slavic harvest festivals are unclear, in large part due to lack of historical documents from pre-Christian times. It is certain however, that North Slavs (both West and East Slavs) formed mostly agricultural cultures and worshipped deities associated with working the land and passage of seasons. For instance every year at the end of the harvest the West Slavic tribe of Rani would gather around the temple in Arkona. Among the offerings to the god Svetovid was a large, human-sized pancake made of newly threshed grain from that year's harvest. If the pancake was large enough for the priest to hide behind it, the Slavs believed next year's harvest would be equally rich. Apparently a wreath made of the last straws left on the field at the end of the harvest was also believed to possess magical powers.

== Common features ==
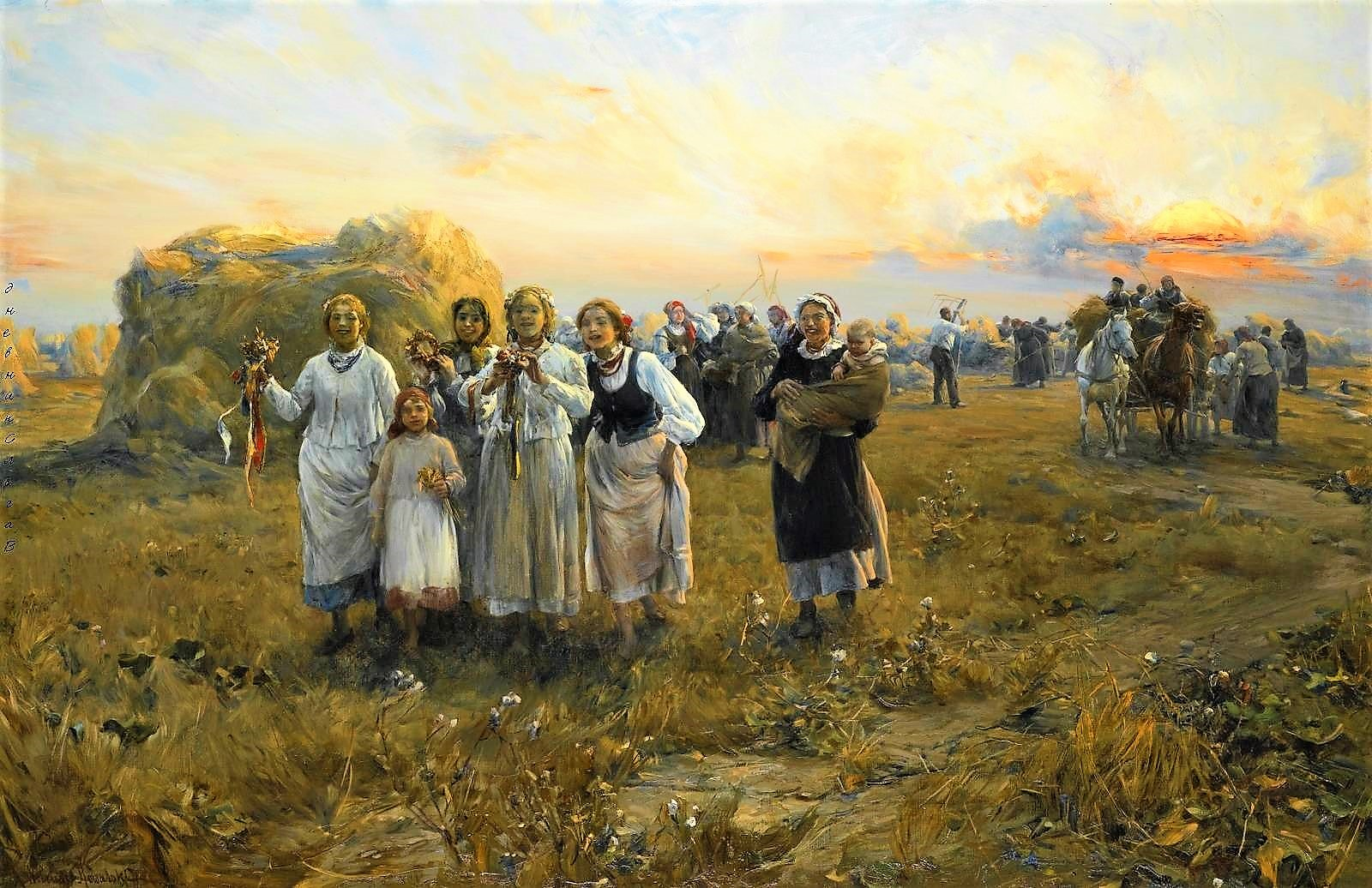
Alfred Wierusz-Kowalski. Dożynki. Poland, 1910

The wreath is a central feature of most celebrations associated with dożynki, as it symbolises a rich harvest, the prospect of wealth and the power of new life vested in the grain gathered during the Summer. The latter probably explains why in many regions the grain from the wreath is used as the first batch of grain threshed and set aside for next year's sowing (for instance this practice is common in the Holy Cross Mountains of Central Poland).

Originally the wreath was in fact a decorated sheaf of grain, decorated with field flowers, ribbons and braided straws. In fact such wreaths were still being made in Poland in the 1930s. However, with time other forms of wreath became more popular, including the now-typical round wreath, but crown-shaped, oval or rectangular wreaths are also popular in various regions.

The sheaf or the wreath is usually brought back into the village by a ceremonial procession. It is often blessed, either by a Christian priest, or in an extra-religious way. For instance in Masovia the wreath is usually brought to the church for the Catholic priest to bless it with holy water. In other regions however it is the priest (Catholic, Orthodox or Greek Catholic) who is brought to the site where the final celebrations take place.

=== Time frame ===
Originally the pre-Christian rite was performed on the autumn equinox (23 September). With time the rite became more closely associated with the actual end of fieldwork in the particular region. However, the time between the end of harvest and the festivities varies from area to area. For instance, in the vicinity of Kielce in central Poland and Kraków in southern Poland the wreath was traditionally blessed already on the Feast of the Assumption of Mary (15 August); it was then stored for a night or two in the house of the elder and the manor, before being threshed and the grain immediately sowed in the fields.

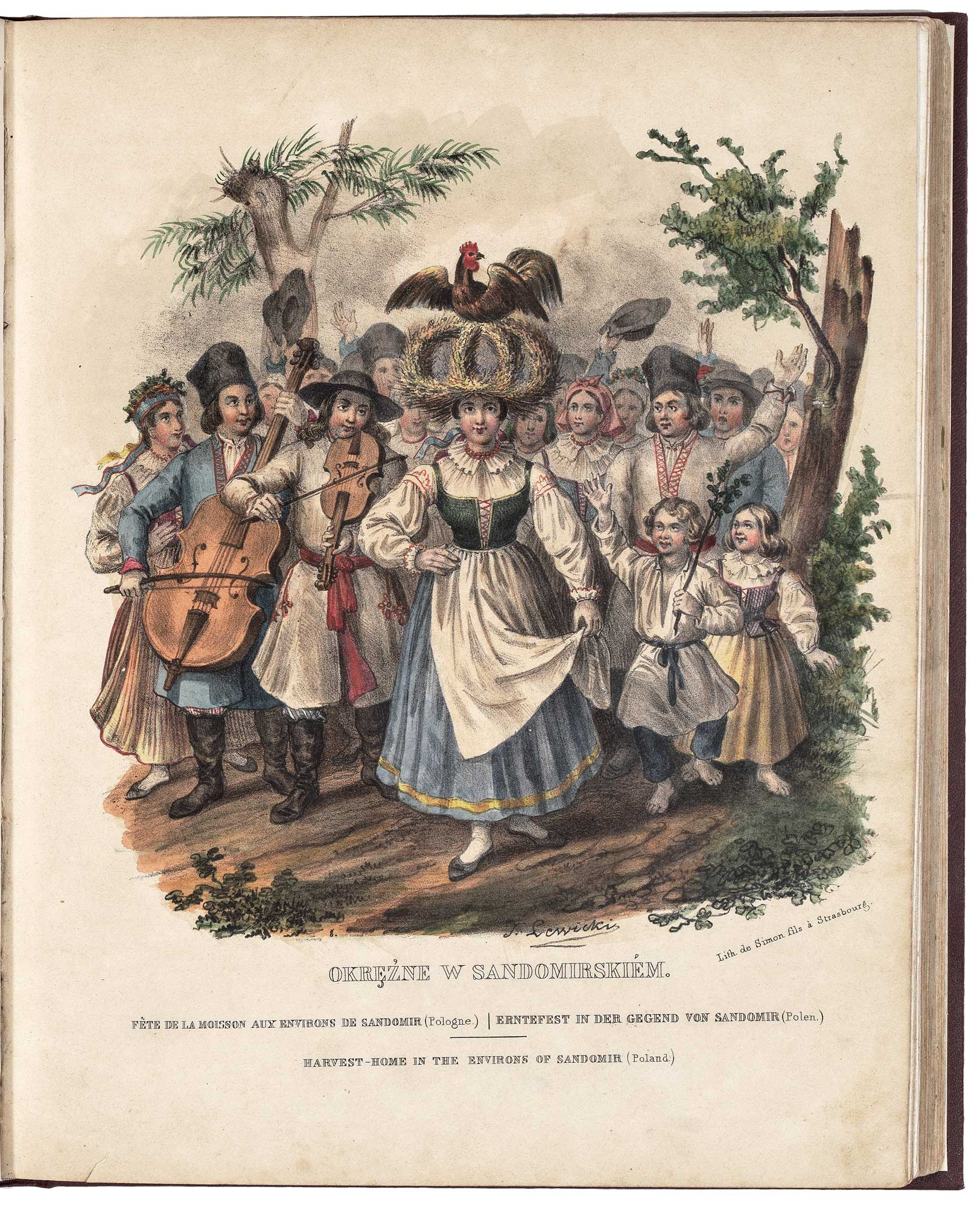
"Okrężne in the Sandomierz Region"

== In Poland ==
In Poland the tradition is variously called Polish: dożynki, wyżynki, obrzynki, wieniec, wieńcowe, okrężne. The tradition has survived since pre-Christian times, it is known as the largest agricultural holiday and a time for celebrating the hard work of peasantry throughout the whole year. It has been observed after the harvest since the time of the feudal systems of the Middle Ages. While many regional variants of this festival have existed throughout the history of the Polish nation, there were three elements that could be found everywhere: ritual cutting of the last ears of crops, making a wreath and marching with it to the chata cottage house or the dwór manor house, and finally a feast and entertainment with traditional dances. After 1945, dożynki in the Polish People's Republic took on a more political character and were used for propaganda efforts to highlight the strength of the workers' and peasants' alliance, but folk customs remained an integral part of these celebrations; in the 1990s, following the collapse of the Eastern Bloc, authorities restored the more religious meaning of the festival that was present in Interwar Poland while upholding the usual folk traditions.

In present-day Poland, a nationwide "Presidential Harvest Festival" (Dożynki Prezydenckie) has been intermittently observed since its creation in 1927 by president Ignacy Mościcki in Spała. Modern celebrations of dożynki can have a religious or secular character, but they always involve observing traditional customs associated with the end of the harvest season. In the case of a harvest festival of a religious nature, thanks for the crops are usually given to God and the Mother of God. However, in some parts of Poland it is ethnic Slavic gods who are revered during dożynki; these celebrations are cultivated mostly by neo-pagan religious minorities, referring to the Slavic Native Faith beliefs attributed to the Early Slavs.

== In Russia ==
It is the ethnolinguistic phenomenon in the history the day of the folk calendar of the Eastern Slavs and the completion of the harvest ritual, falling in many places August 15 (28), in other places celebrated in September. By mid-August harvest grain ends, hence the name of the holiday. Includes the rituals associated with last (dozhinochnym) sheaf, the ritual of "curling beard" and a celebratory meal. In the Russian North, a meal made from tolokno marks the end of the harvest and goes by a variety of names, such as dezhen' (Russian: дежень).

The festival's practice was almost lost in Russia during the Soviet period.

== See also ==
- Thanksgiving
