= Korovai =

Traditional Eastern European bread

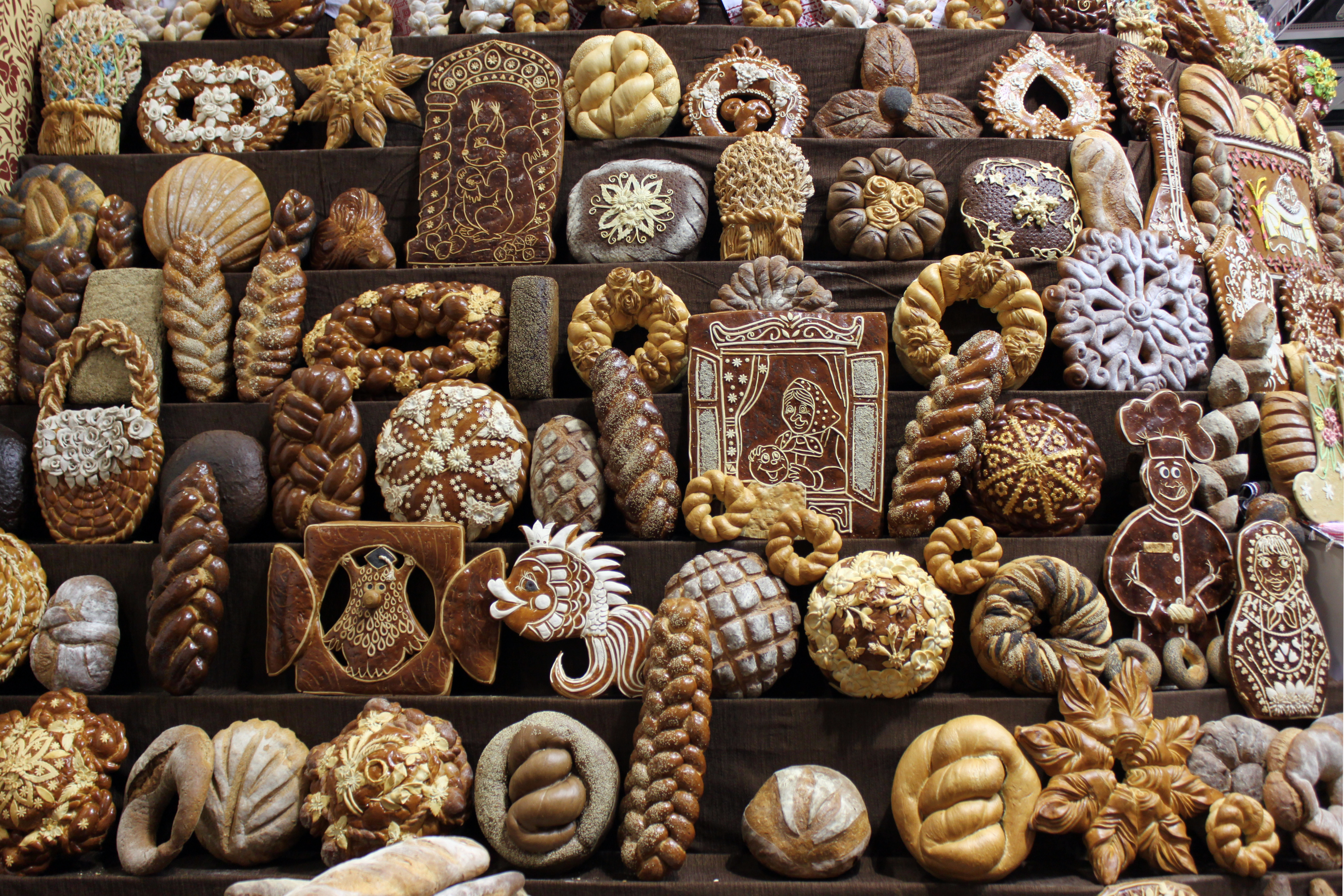
- Russian karavais at the Berlin International Green Week
- Alternative names: Karavai, kravai
- Type: Bread
- Region or state: Eastern Europe
- Main ingredients: Wheat flour

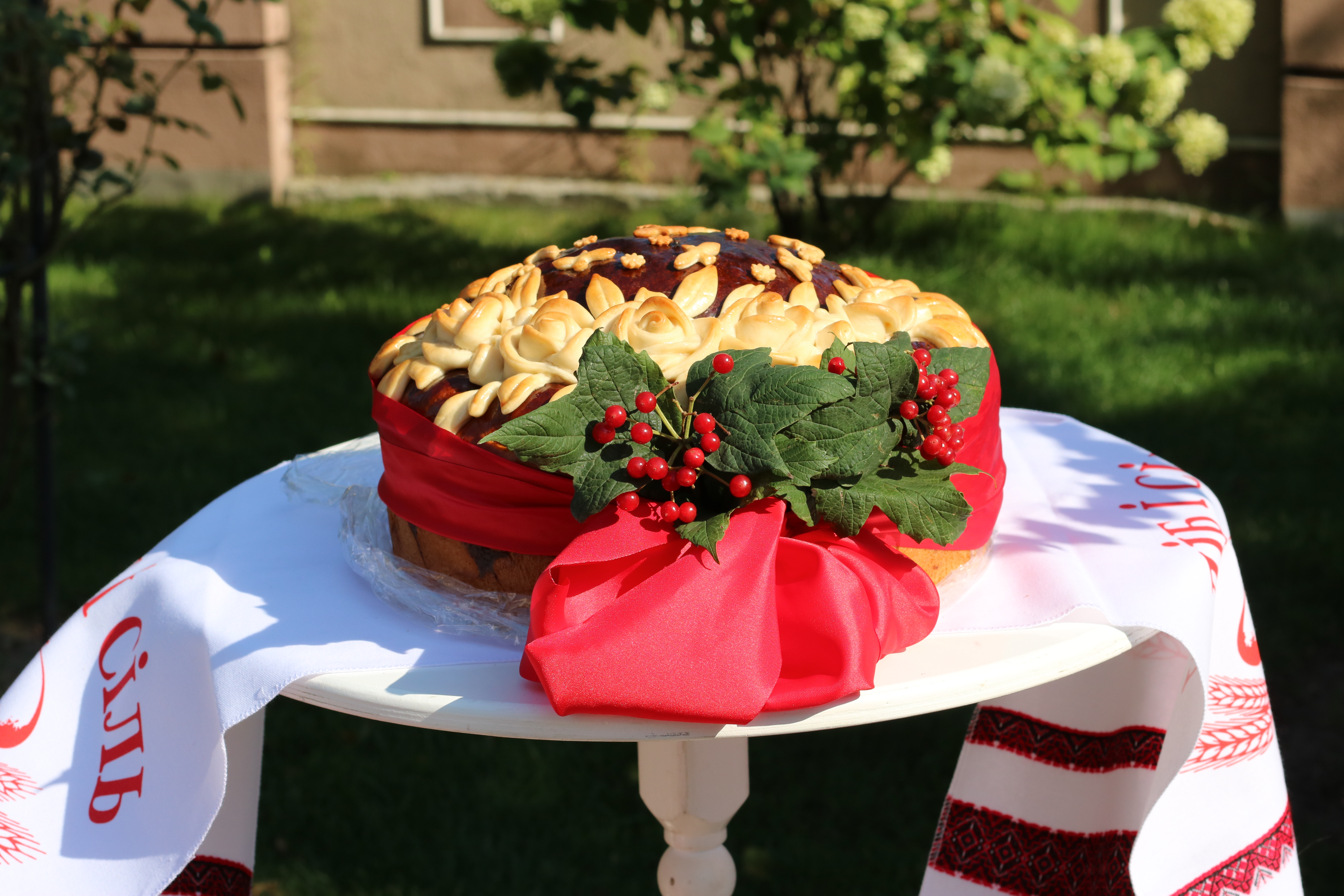
Wedding korovai in Kyiv, 2020

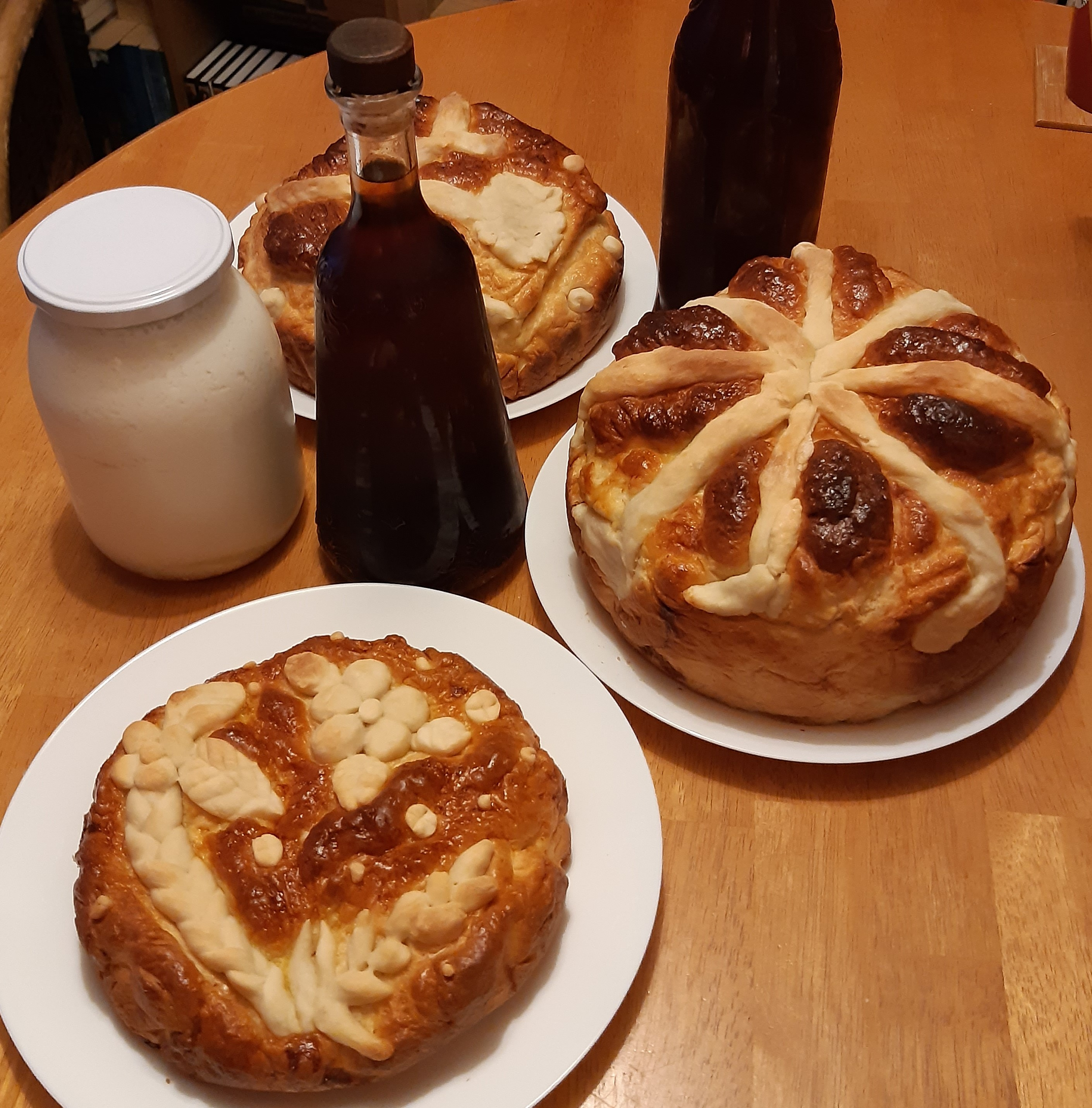
A korovai and a kolach served alongside kvass and kefir in a Polish household

A korovai (Ukrainian: коровай, romanized: korovay, pronounced [koroˈwɑj]; Russian: каравай, romanized: karavai, before the 1956 reform), karavai (modern Russian: каравай, romanized: karavay, pronounced [kərɐˈvaj]; Belarusian: каравай, romanized: karavay; Old East Slavic: караваи, romanized: karavai), or kravai (Bulgarian: кравай, romanized: kravay, pronounced [krɐˈvaj]) is a traditional Bulgarian, Ukrainian, and Russian bread, most often served at weddings, where it has great symbolic meaning. It has remained part of the wedding tradition in Belarus, Russia, Ukraine, as well as in the Russian and Ukrainian diasporas. Its use in Belarus, Russia and Ukraine dates back to hospitality and holiday customs in ancient Rus. A similar bread (Polish: korowaj) is made in parts of eastern Poland. A round korovai is a common element of the bread-and-salt ceremony of welcome.

== Origins and decoration of korovai ==
The bread has ancient origins, and comes from the pagan belief in the magical properties of grain. Korovai was a large round braided bread, traditionally baked from wheat flour and decorated with symbolic flags and figurines, such as suns, moons, birds, animals, and pine cones. Wheat stalks, herbs, nuts, flowers and fruit were used to embellish the korovai. The white, shaped decorations are typically made from salt dough, also known as dead dough or baker's clay. The bread has no set design, and the style and ornamentation of the korovai varies by region, although colors red, gold and silver were most commonly employed in decoration.

The bread was traditionally prepared in the home of the bride by women who sang traditional songs to guide them through the making. These women were called the korovainytsi (Ukrainian: коровайниці, romanized: korovaynytsi; karavainitsi, Russian: каравайницы, romanized: karavaynitsy), and were most often invited in odd numbers to do the job of making the bread, usually seven.

The embellishments served a symbolic function. Two birds, made out of dough, represent the couple, and other birds represent family and friends. The entire arrangement is surrounded by a wreath of periwinkle, a symbol of love and purity. The korovai receives blessings before it is placed in the oven for baking.

The bride and groom were given the korovai as a blessing before the wedding ceremony. The korovai was shared by all the wedding guests, and this was considered the culmination of the wedding. During times of hardship, when a wedding was impossible, the blessing and sharing of bread was often considered enough to constitute a marriage in the eyes of the community.

== Dividing the korovai ==
The top part of the korovai symbolizes the Moon; it is divided in half and belongs to the marrying couple, the next slice goes to the mother and father of the bride, and so on. In eastern Ukraine, the mother receives a pair of shoes made out of dough, while the father is given an owl, out of those decorating the korovai.

The bottom section of the korovai called the pidoshva can be shared with the guests and the band as a symbol of good luck and future prosperity.

== See also ==
- Kolach (bread)
