= Lithuanian cuisine =

Lithuanian cuisine features products suited to the cool and moist northern climate of Lithuania: barley, potatoes, rye, beets, greens, berries, and mushrooms are locally grown, and dairy products are one of its specialties. Various ways of pickling were used to preserve food for winter. Soups are widely regarded as the key to good health and are served extremely frequently. Since it shares its climate and agricultural practices with Eastern Europe, Lithuanian cuisine has much in common with its Baltic neighbors and, in general, northeastern European countries.

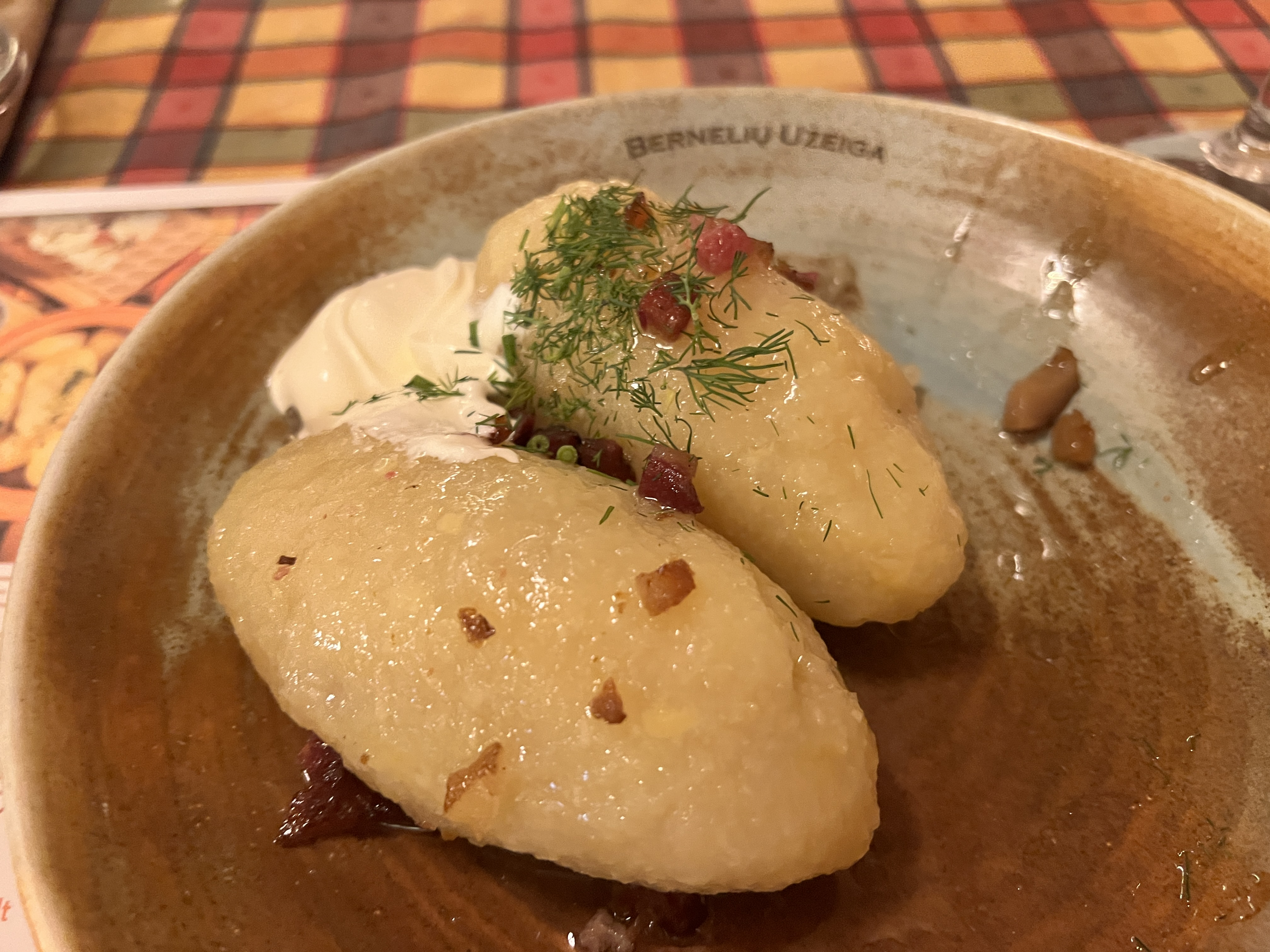
Cepelinai served with sour cream and topped with diced bacon

Long-lasting agricultural and foraging traditions along with a variety of influences during the country's history formed Lithuanian cuisine.

German traditions have had an influence on Lithuanian cuisine, introducing pork and potato dishes, such as potato pudding (kugelis or kugel) and intestines stuffed with mashed potato (vėdarai), as well as the baroque tree cake known as šakotis. Lithuanian noblemen usually hired French chefs; French cuisine influence came to Lithuania in this way. The most exotic influence is Eastern (Karaite) cuisine, and the dish kibinai which became widely known in Lithuania. Lithuanians and other nations that were in the Grand Duchy of Lithuania also share some dishes and beverages. Lithuanian cuisine also influenced Russian and Polish cuisines.

== History of Lithuanian cuisine ==
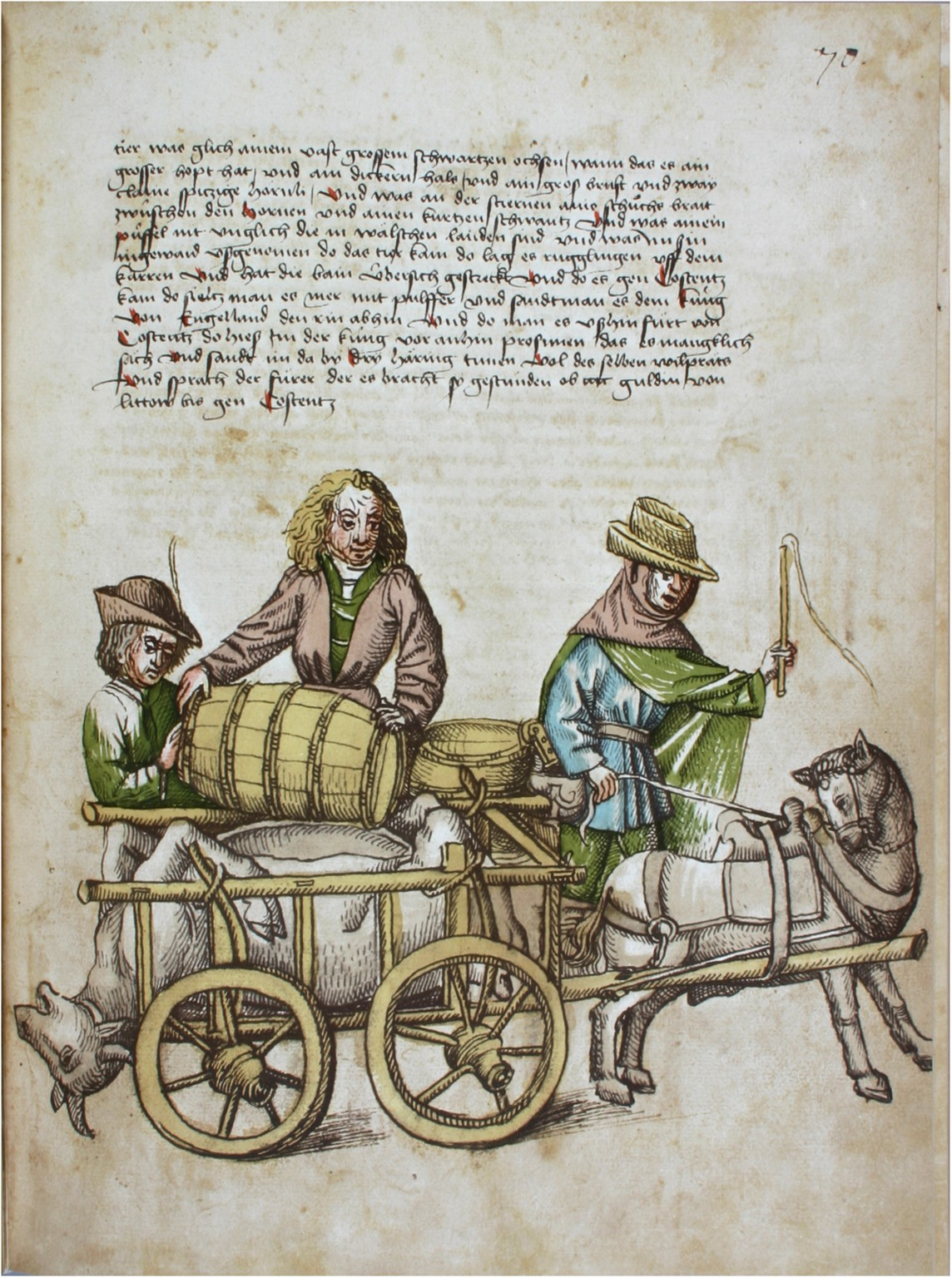
Salt-cured ox, the barrel of beer and other food from Lithuania being sent to the feast of the Council of Constance. (Rosgartenmuseum Konstanz, Hs. 1, Richental: Konzilschronik)

The earliest mentions of food and agriculture of the Baltic people (Aestii) and related customs comes from Tacitus circa 98 AD: "they cultivate grain and other crops with a perseverance unusual among the indolent Germans."

The 9th-century traveler Wulfstan attested usage of mead among West Balts: "There is a great deal of honey and fishing. The king and the most powerful men drink mare's milk, the poor men and the slaves drink mead. ... There is no ale brewed among the Este but there is plenty of mead."

In the 14th century, almost all cereals and legume known today in Lithuania were already grown, but rye was the most popular, since it was easier to grow in the Northern European climate and the crop was more predictable. In the hillfort of Maišiagala in the layer of 13–14th century about 20 sorts of various cereals and legumes were found – winter and summer rye, wheat, barley, oat, millet, buckwheat, lentil, vetches, peas, broad beans.

In the Middle Ages, hunting was the main way to provide oneself with meat. It is known that Vytautas the Great before the Battle of Žalgiris organized a big hunting in the Baltvyžis forest and prepared barrels of salt-cured meat for the army. Game was also a staple of noblemen: wisents, aurochs, and deer were hunted. Lithuania had long-lasting wars (about 200 years) with Teutonic Order. It also kept diplomatic relationships with it, during which various presents were exchanged - it is known what Teutonic Order sent a rare wine to Anna, Grand Duchess of Lithuania, wife of Vytautas the Great, in 1416. At this time Lithuanian nobleman already imported saffron, cinnamon, rice, pepper, raisins for their needs. The Congress of Lutsk, hosted by Vytautas the Great, was another example of medieval Lithuanian cuisine. Chronicles report that seven hundred barrels of honey, wine, 700 oxen, 1400 sheep, hundreds of elk, wild boar, and other dishes were consumed daily.

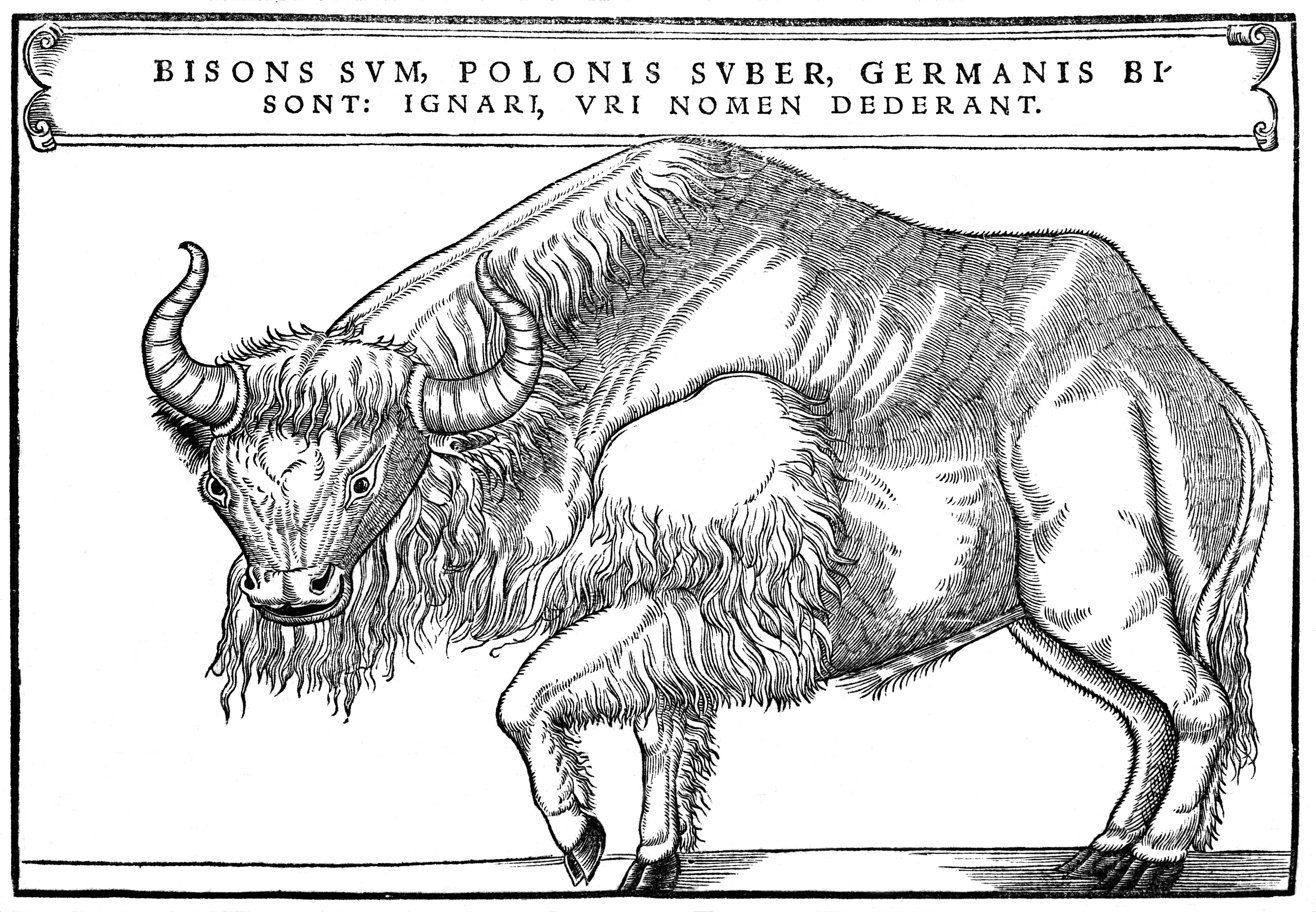
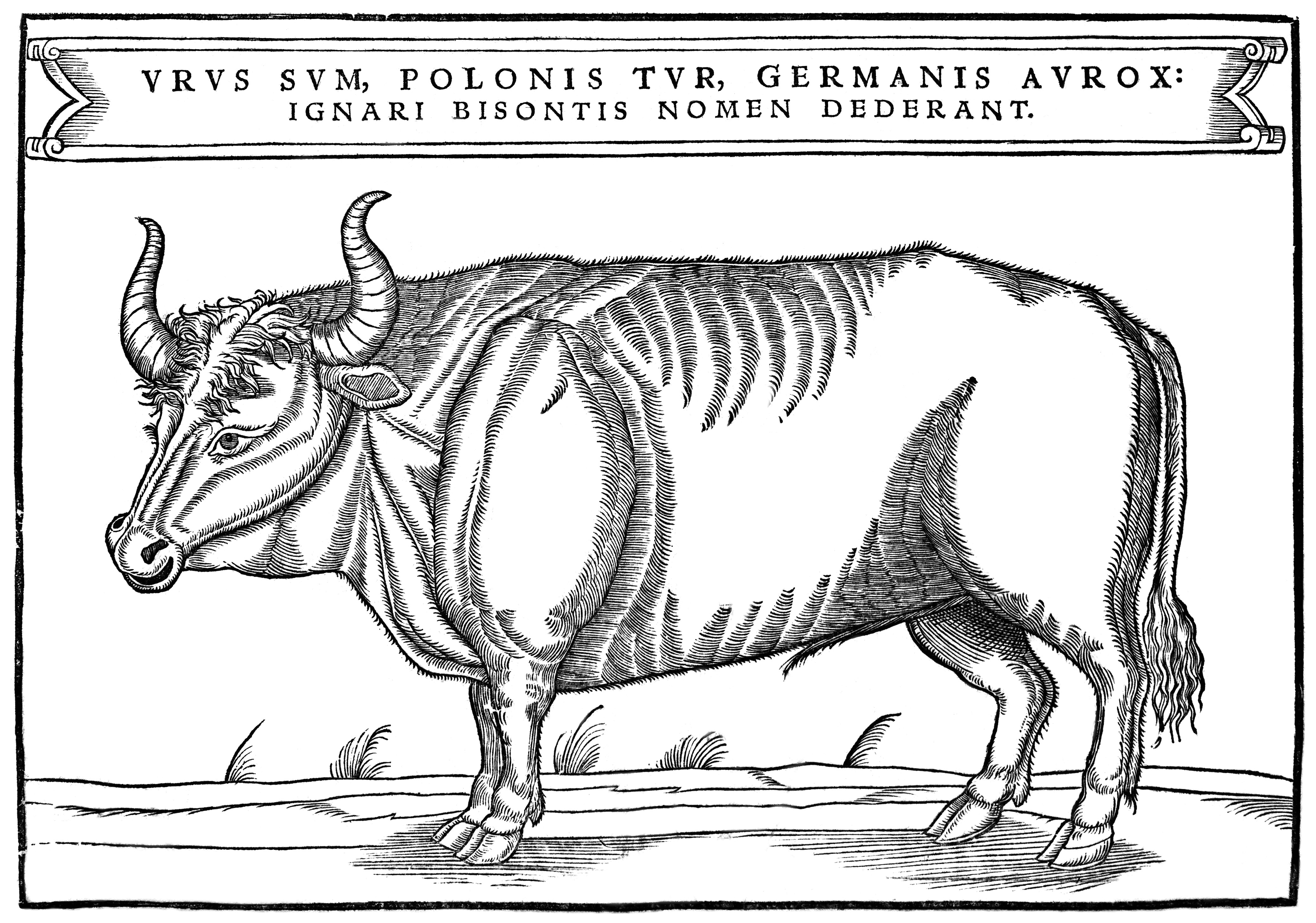
Wisent (Lith. stumbras) and aurochs (Lith. tauras) were popular objects of hunting in medieval Lithuania. Many toponyms related to the word tauras in Lithuania.

Traditional Lithuanian hunting and landscape, still existing conflicts between paganism and Christianity was described by Nicolaus Hussovianus in his Latin poem Carmen de statura, feritate ac venatione bisontis (A Song about the Appearance, Savagery and Hunting of the Bison, 1523).

Many culinary innovations came from Italy with Bona Sforza, Grand Duchess consort of Lithuania. Bona Sforza introduced the fork and traditional Italian food – olives, olive oil; made wine and wheat flour more popular. Parsnips, cauliflowers, spinach, and even artichokes were introduced and grown. It is assumed that Palace of the Grand Dukes of Lithuania had their own kitchen garden. Daughter of Bona Sforza, Catherine Jagiellon after marrying John III of Sweden introduced the fork and other cultural habits to Sweden. Son of Bona Sforza Sigismund II Augustus had an Italian chef Sigismondo Fanelli, living in Vilnius, Palace of the Grand Dukes of Lithuania.

The court account books of Alexander Jagiellon mention court officials also associated with the kitchen: the titles Master of the Kitchen was the magnate Petras Aleknaitis, while the actual functions of the kitchen-master were carried by kitchen senior Raclovas, other Kitchen Master is also mentioned – Mikalojus Jundilaitis and the Carver Butrimas Jokūbaitis Nemiraitis. In the 16th century, a water pipe was built from Vingriai springs straight to the kitchen of Palace of the Grand Dukes of Lithuania in Vilnius.

Influences on the Lithuanian cuisine during the 13th – 19th centuries

In the sale contract made in 1623 by Elisabeth Sophie von Brandenburg, wife of Jonušas Radvila and Jonušas Kiška, she sold a garden in Vilnius. The text of the treaty has very detailed mentionings of the garden plants such as grafted apple trees, pears, plums (prunus domestica), cherries, wild cherries, vitis, hawthorns, dog roses. A garden for Italian vegetables (as they called back then) is also very detailed. That is potatoes, artichokes, asparagus, lamb's lettuce, rucola, garden cress, spinach, melons, beets, rushes, French parsley, Italian onions, lettuce, chicory. And spices and decorative shrubs: anise, peppermints, estragon, dill, true indigo and junipers. Wooden orangerie is also mentioned which was used to grow fig-trees and common walnuts. In the 17th century, the rulers and nobleman of Lithuania consumed grapes, oranges, melons, raspberries, strawberries, cherries, and plums; imported ginger, cinnamon, almonds and pepper.

The growing of potatoes in Lithuania is known from the 17th century, but it became more widespread only in the 18th century.

Archeological finds at the place of the Palace of the Grand Dukes of Lithuania revealed a lot of information about the food eaten, cutlery and serving of the rulers of Lithuania.

First explorer of the Lithuanian flora, botanist Jurgis Pabrėža described spicery growing in Lithuania.

In 18th-century and 19th-century recipes à la Lithuanienne appeared in the French culinary books. The romantic image of Lithuania was associated with lush forests and game – no wonder the recipes à la Lithuanienne were mostly dishes prepared from moose, bear, or grey partridge. La Cuisine classique by Urbain Dubois and Émile Bernard, published in 1856 contained Lithuanian recipes of goose soup and sauce. A culinary book by Alphonse Petit La gastronomie en Russie, published in 1900 included eight Lithuanian recipes.

In the twentieth century in interwar Lithuania, many girls attended Amatų mokykla (The Trade School), where young women were trained to prepare various types of dishes and learned various recipes, proper table manners, economy and running the household. These schools led to spreading of similar recipes throughout the country.

During the past years, restaurants in Lithuania emerged which specialize in historic Lithuanian cuisine, culinary heritage and its interpretations.

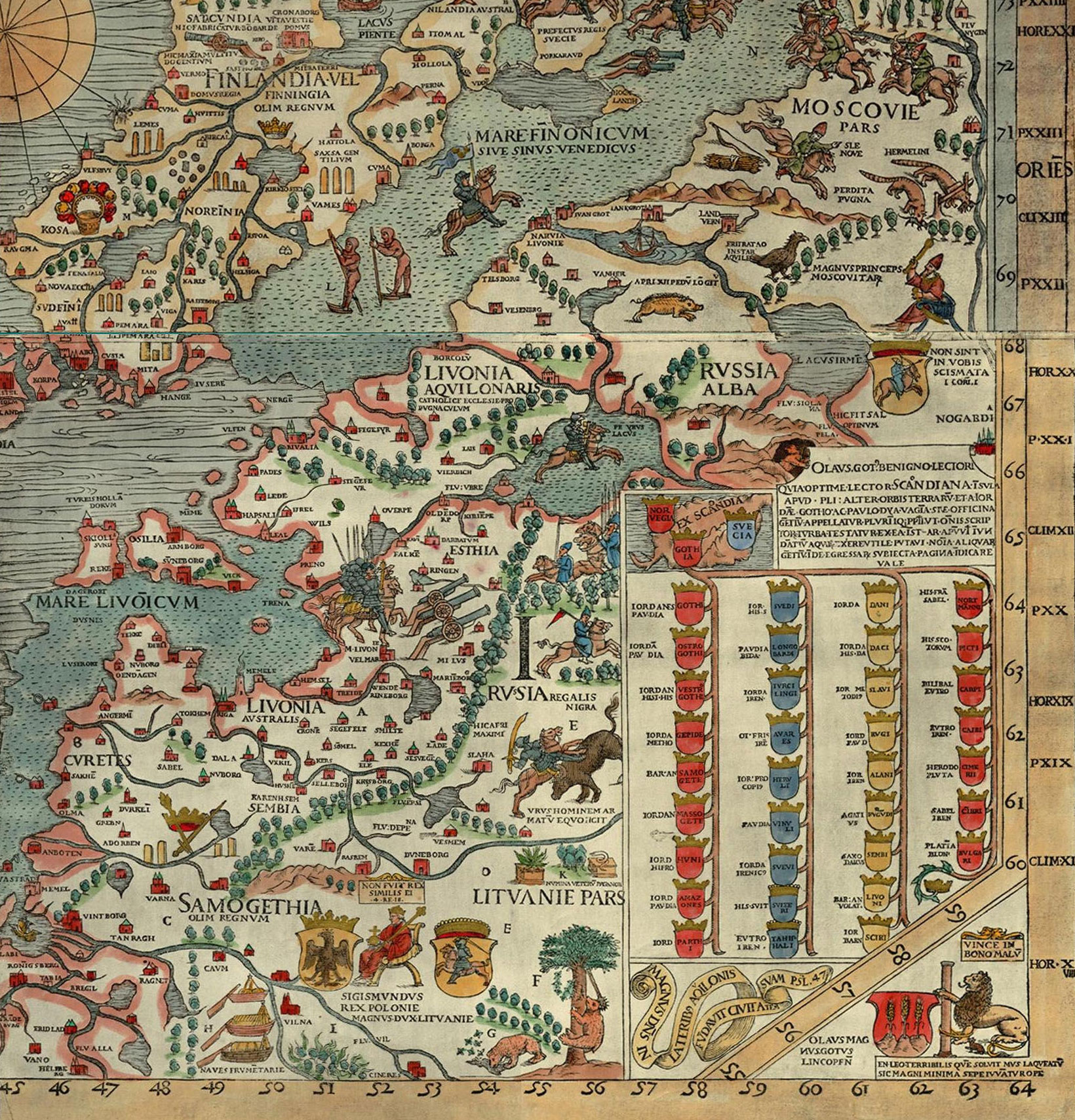
Part of Olaus Magnus' map depicting Lithuania: Lithuanian type of crop trade ships (naves frumentarie) – vytinė is seen close to Vilnius, also beehives protection from the bears (on the right side)

Palace of the Grand Dukes of Lithuania in Vilnius. Many European novelties and fashions like opera and Italian or French cuisine reached Lithuania through this Palace.

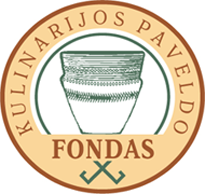
Logo of the Lithuanian Culinary Heritage Foundation used to mark the food produced using traditional Lithuanian way.

== Bread ==
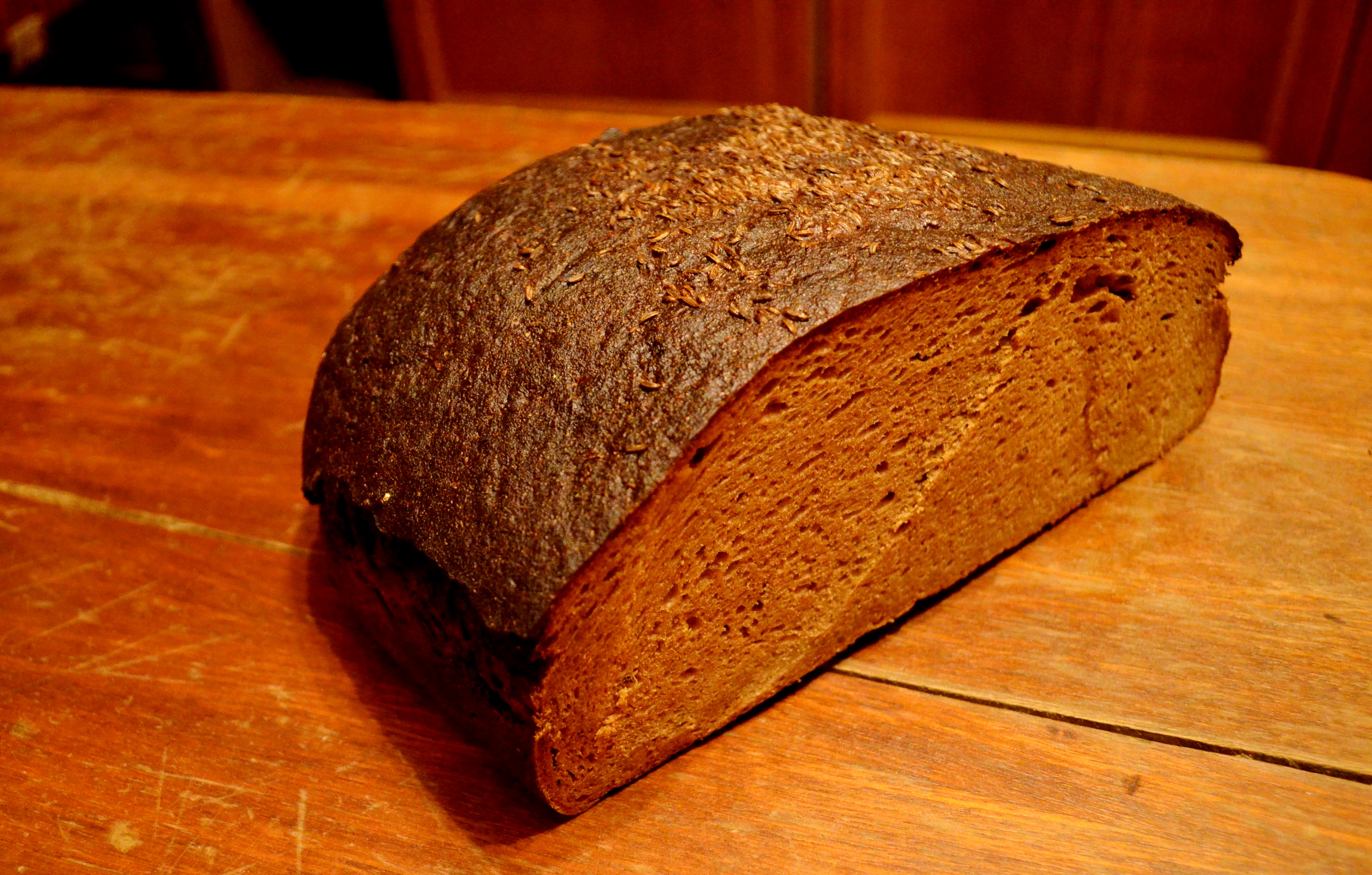
Ruginė duona, dark rye bread

One of the oldest and most fundamental Lithuanian food products was and is rye bread. Rye bread was eaten every day for breakfast, lunch and dinner. Bread played an important role in family rituals and agrarian ceremonies. Traditionally, the centerpiece of Lithuanian cuisine is dark rye bread (ruginė duona) which is used more often than light wheat breads. The archeological finds reveal that bread in the 9th - 14th centuries in Lithuania was very similar to the current rye bread. The dough is usually based on a sourdough starter, and includes some wheat flour to lighten the finished product. Traditionally each home had its own sourdough yeast – raugas, which also had symbolical meaning of the home. Rye bread is often eaten as an open-faced sandwich, buttered or spread with cheese. It is sometimes flavored with caraway, or with some onion. Traditional bread is baked on sweet flag leaves. Bread baking was considered an important ritual. Bread was baked in a special oven for bread - duonkepė krosnis. Lithuanian proverb says - Be aukso apsieis, be duonos ne (One can manage without gold, but not without bread).

Some varieties of Lithuanian bread contain whole seeds of rye and wheat; this type of bread is referred to as grūdėtoji, i.e. "seeded" bread.

== Vegetables and spices ==
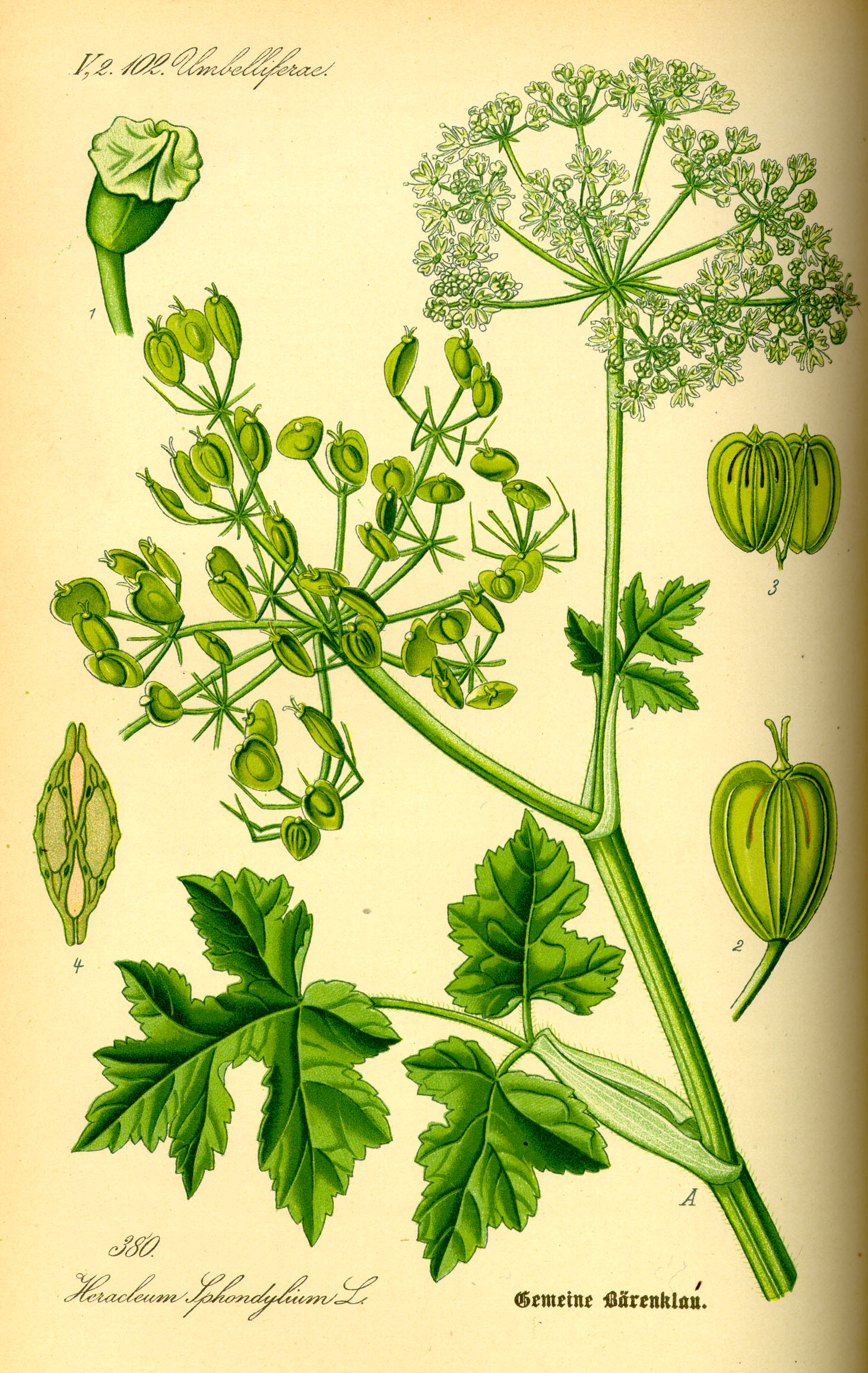
Heracleum sphondylium (Lankinis barštis) was used since prehistory up to the 18th century to make an archaic version of barščiai soup

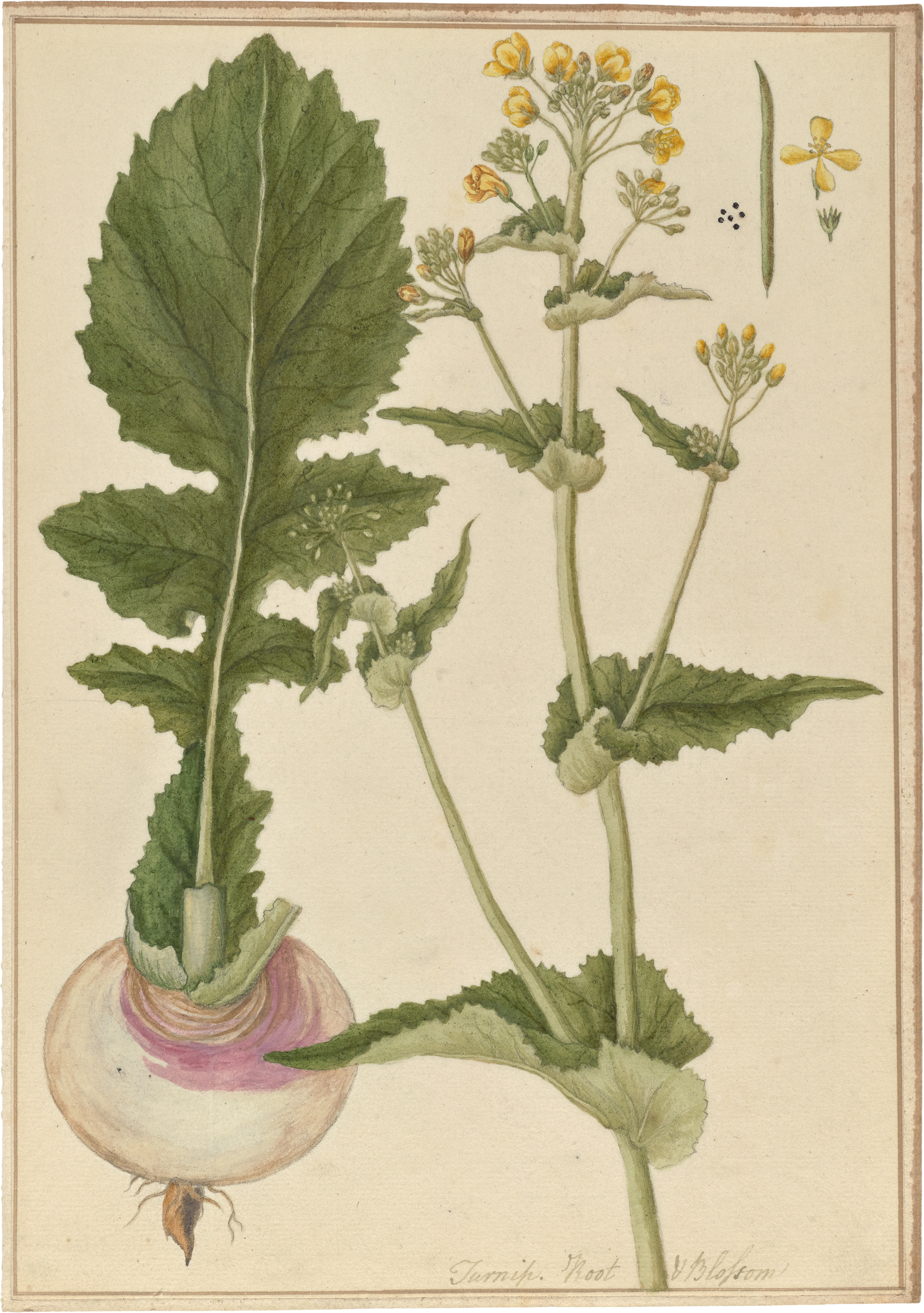
Brassica rapa (ropė) was a popular root vegetable before the prevalence of potatoes in the 18th century.

The most commonly used vegetable in Lithuanian recipes is the potato; in its simplest forms, it is boiled, baked, or sauteed, often garnished with dill, but a tremendous variety of potato recipes exist. Potatoes were introduced into Lithuania in the late 18th century, were found to prosper in its climate, and soon became indispensable.

Cucumbers, dill pickles, radishes and greens are quite popular. Beets (burokai) are grown more widely than in other areas of the world and are often used for making borscht and side dishes. Cabbage is another popular vegetable, used as a basis for soups, or wrapped around fillings (balandėliai). Tomatoes are now available year-round in stores, but those home-grown in family greenhouses are still considered superior. Sorrel is grown in the gardens for soup and salad.

Lithuanian herbs and seasonings include mustard seed, horseradish (krienai), dill (krapai), caraway seed (kmynai), garlic, coriander, oregano, bay leaf, juniper berries (kadagio uogos), hemp seeds and fruit essences. Vanilla and pepper were scarce during the Soviet occupation, but were welcomed back again after restitution of the independence. The cuisine is relatively mild.

Pickling is a popular way to prepare vegetables for winter or just to give them a particular flavour. Cucumbers, beets, dills, homegrown tomatoes, onions, garlic is pickled and available all year round.

Linseed oil was moderately popular.

== Foraging ==
Mushrooming is a popular pastime from mid-summer to autumn. As a staple, mushrooms are usually harvested in the forest; occasionally they are purchased at roadside markets, especially on the road in the Dzūkija region from Druskininkai to Vilnius; the purchasing of mushrooms in shops is rare. Despite its status as a delicacy, mushrooms are thought of by many Lithuanians as hard to digest. Dried mushrooms are used as a seasoning. A number of mushroom species are harvested from the wild, including:

- Baravykas – king bolete;
- Voveraitė (lit. "little squirrel"), lepeška (in Dzūkija region) – chanterelle;
- Gudukas, vokietukas, kalpokas, vištelė – gypsy mushroom.

Baravykas is the most valued and sought-after species; the primary usages are drying and marinating. Dried baravykas has a strong pleasant scent and is used as a seasoning in soups and sauces. Voveraitė is often used fresh as a seasoning in soups or sauteed. The most common dish using this mushroom is voveraitė sauteed with chopped bulb onions and potatoes. Gudukas, arguably the most locally abundant of edible mushrooms due to its lower popularity, is usually marinated. Other edible mushrooms, such as lepšė (Leccinum scabrum), raudonviršis or raudonikis (lit. "red-topped") (Leccinum aurantiacum), makavykas (Suillus variegatus), šilbaravykis (Xerocomus badius), are more rare, but are also gathered and may be used in the same ways as baravykas.

Wild berries are also gathered or, even more frequently than mushrooms, purchased at roadside markets or shops. Bilberries (mėlynės) and lingonberries (bruknės) are the two most abundant species of wild berries. Cranberries (spanguolės) are valued, but their cultivation is limited to certain boggy areas, such as those adjacent to Čepkeliai Marsh. Sour cranberry or lingonberry jam and sweet bilberry jam are all considered excellent sauces for pancakes (blynai). Lingonberry jam is occasionally used as a dressing for fried chicken or turkey or as a sauce for other savory dishes. Fresh bilberries may be put into a cold milk soup. Wild strawberries (žemuogės) are relatively scarce and are usually gathered for immediate consumption.

Foraging

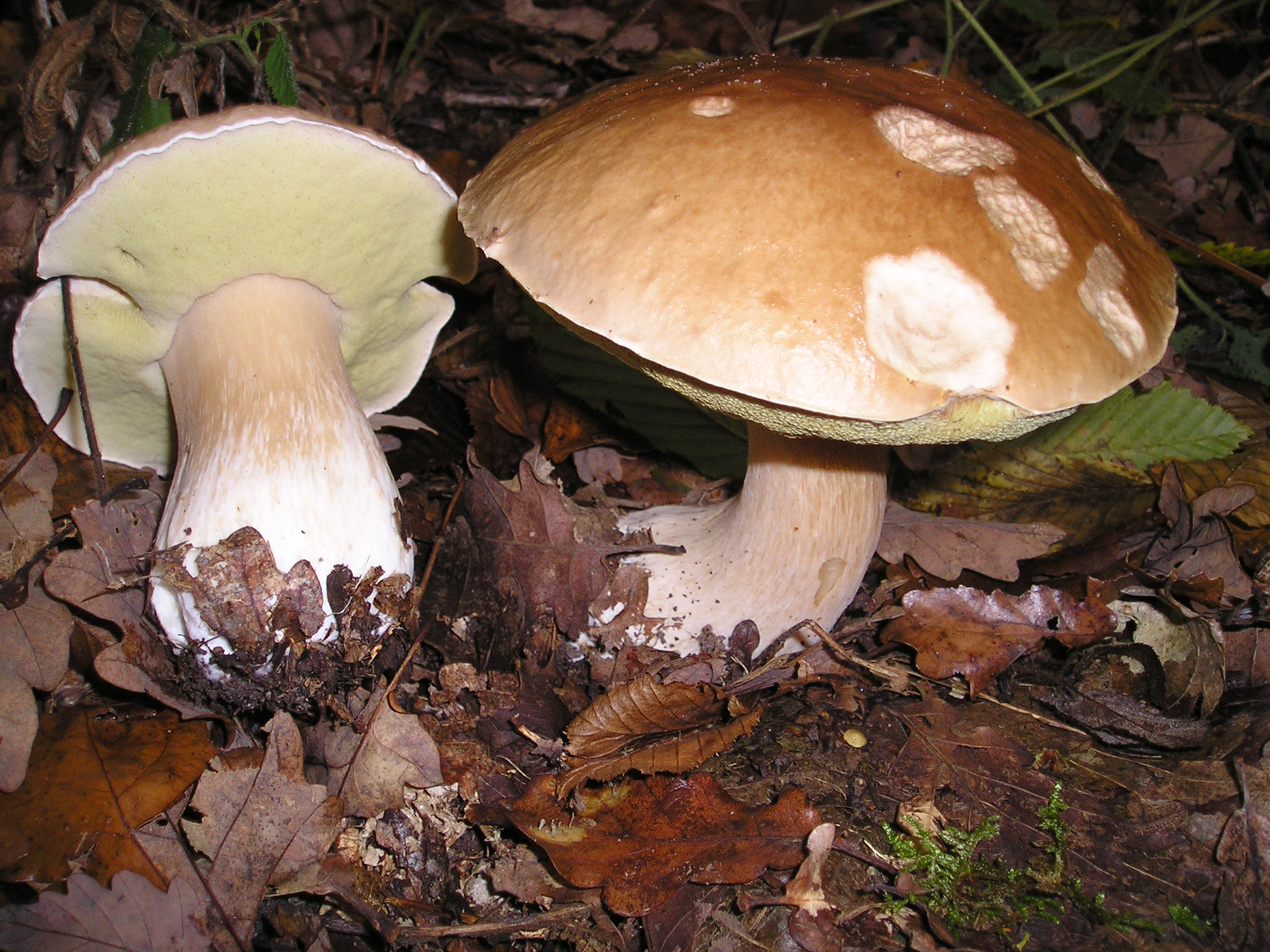
The Cep/Porcino/Penny bun - "King of Mushrooms"

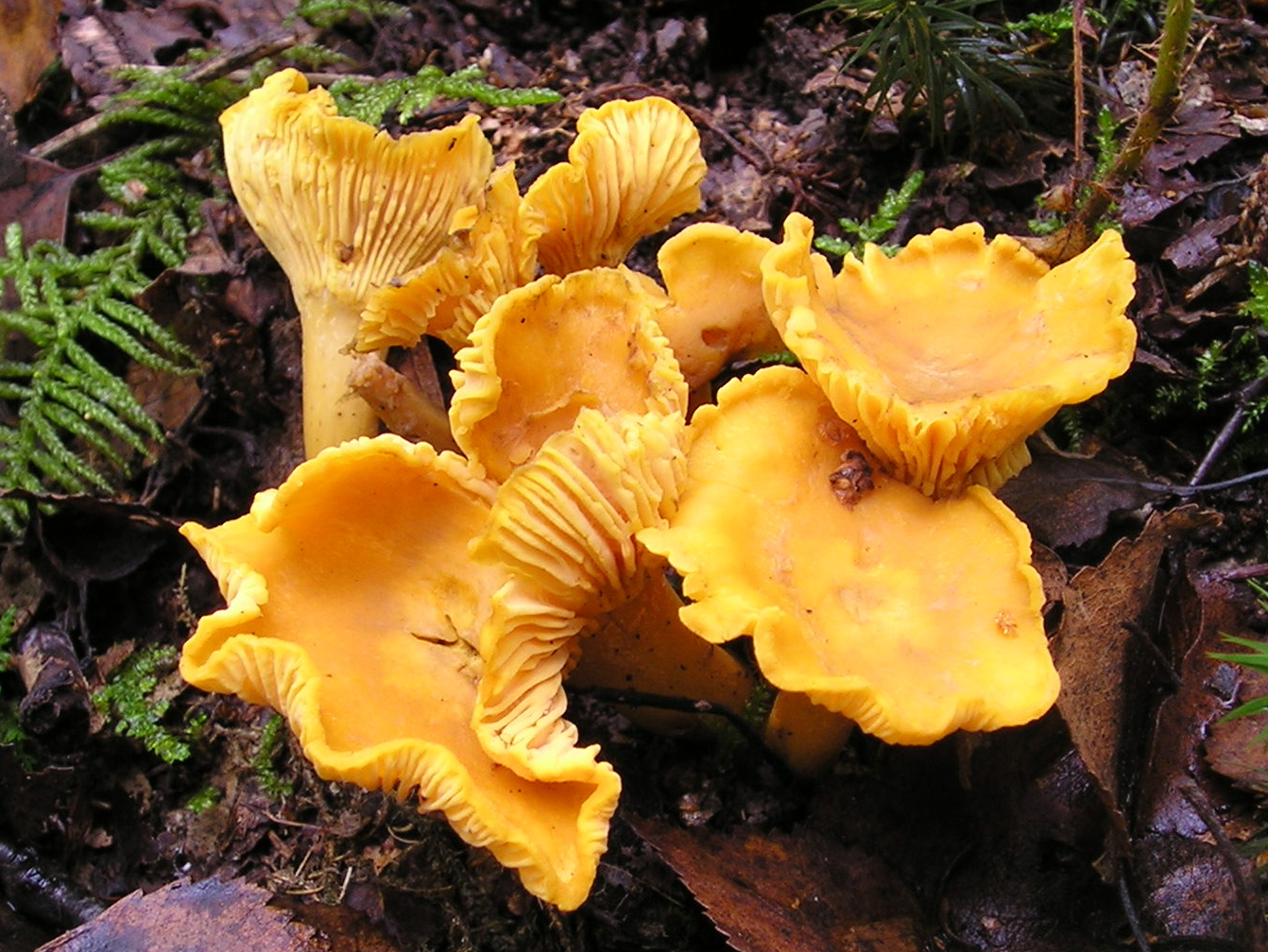
Chanterelles are popular mushrooms in Lithuania

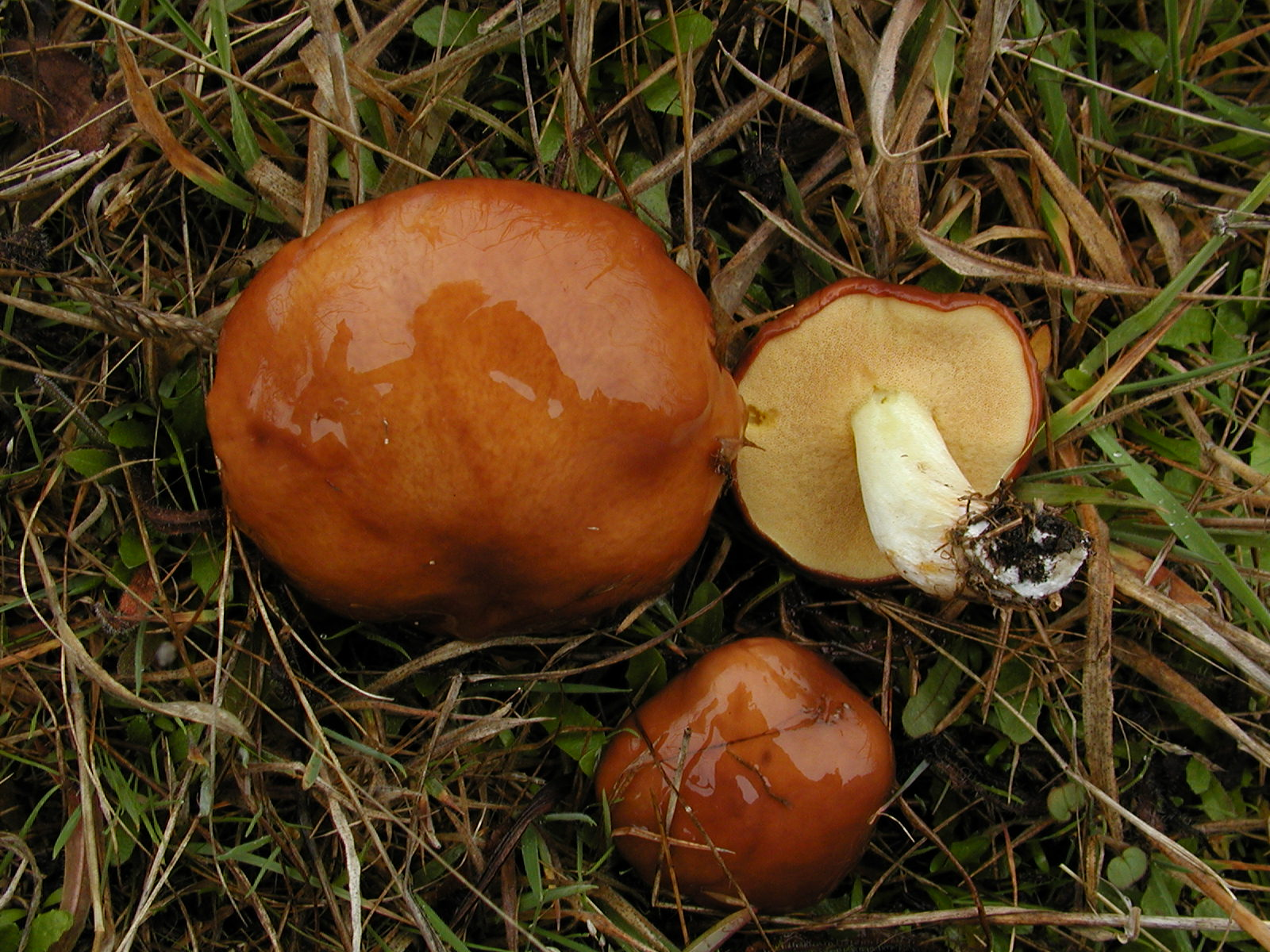
Slippery Jack/Butter-mushroom

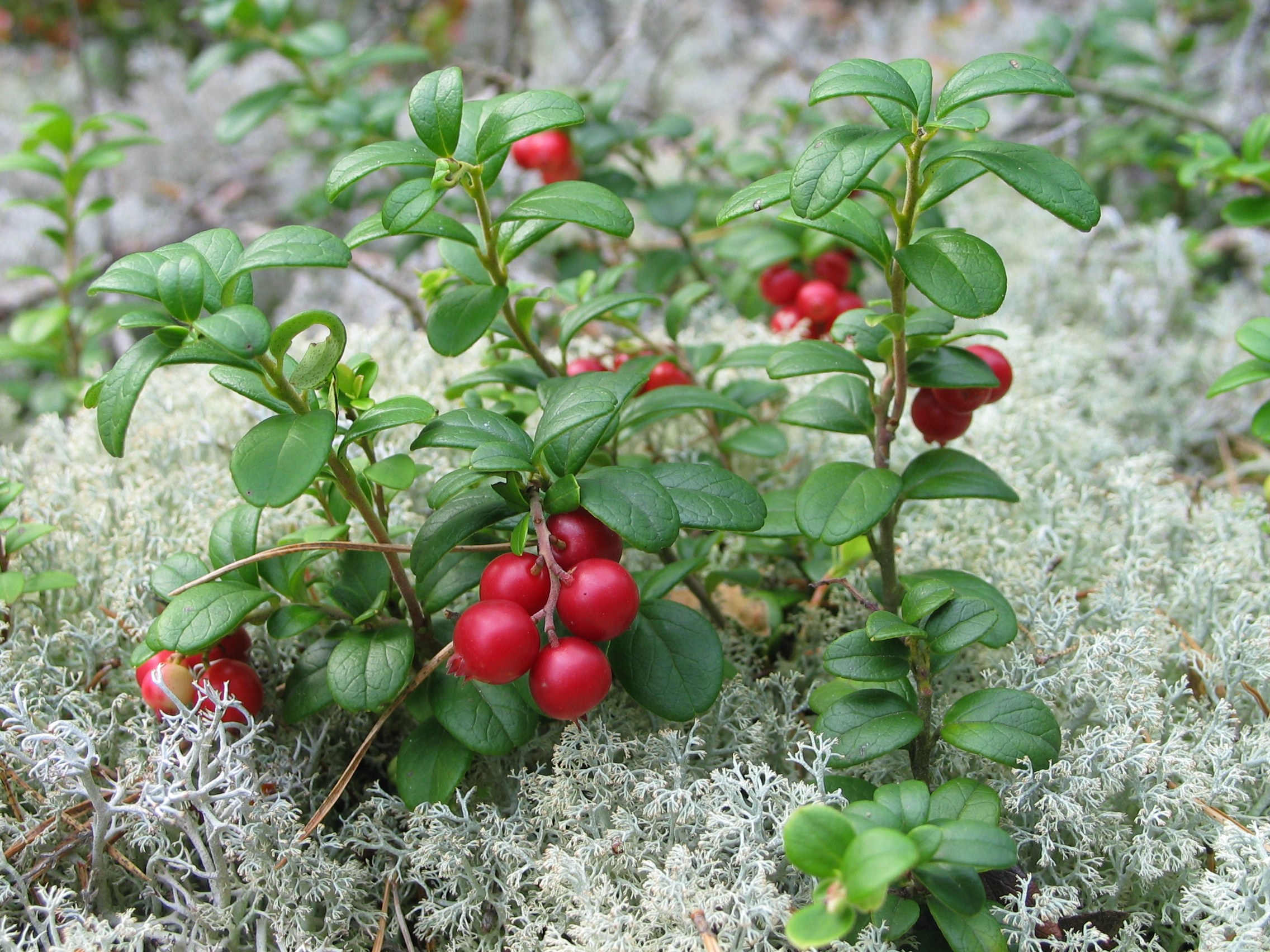
Lingonberry

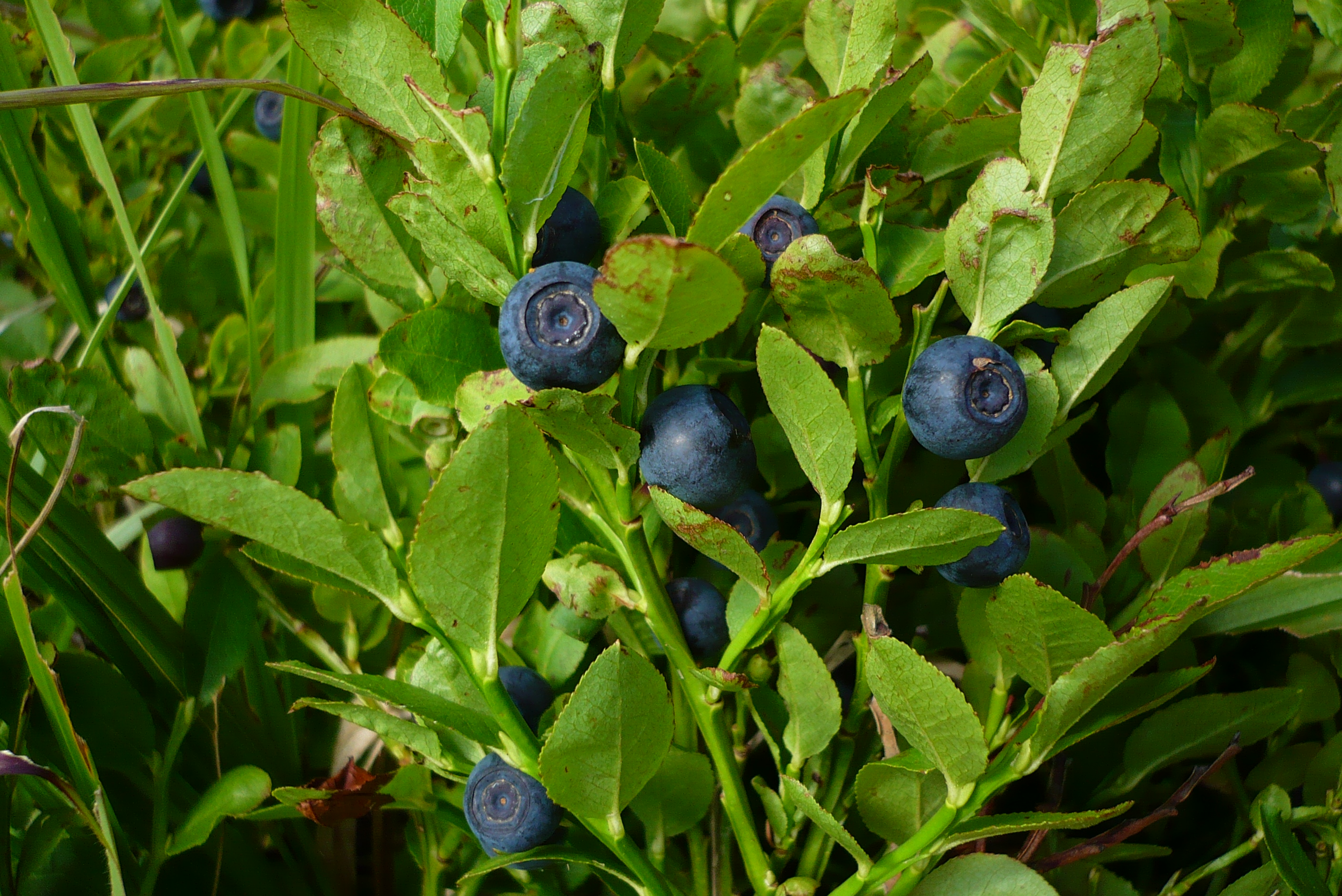
Bilberry

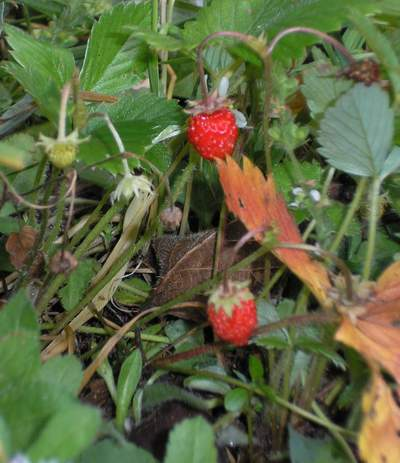
Wild strawberry

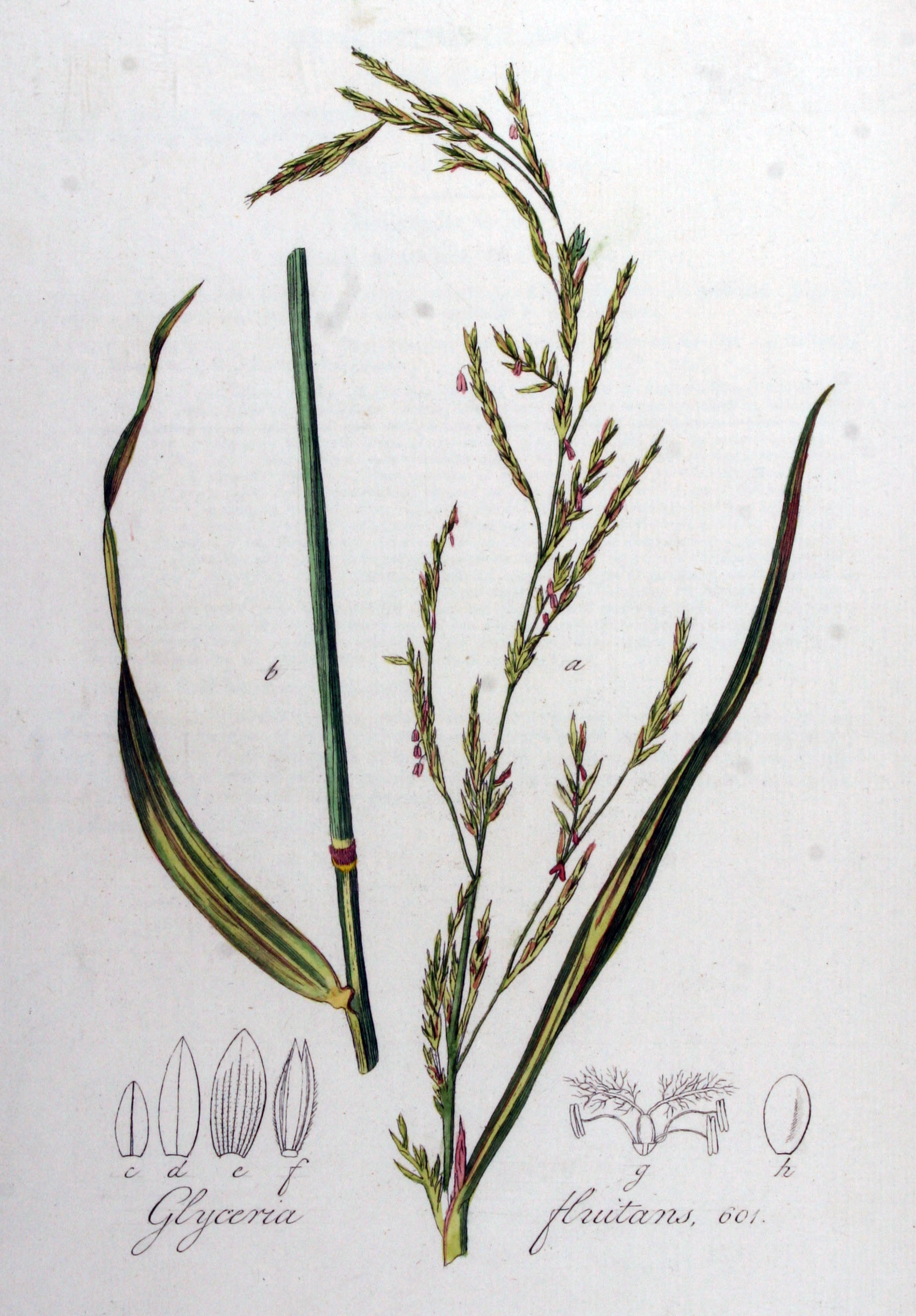
Glyceria fluitans (paprastoji monažolė). The seeds were used for food and are mentioned as being among the natural products of Lithuania Minor along with beeswax, honey, amber and timber.

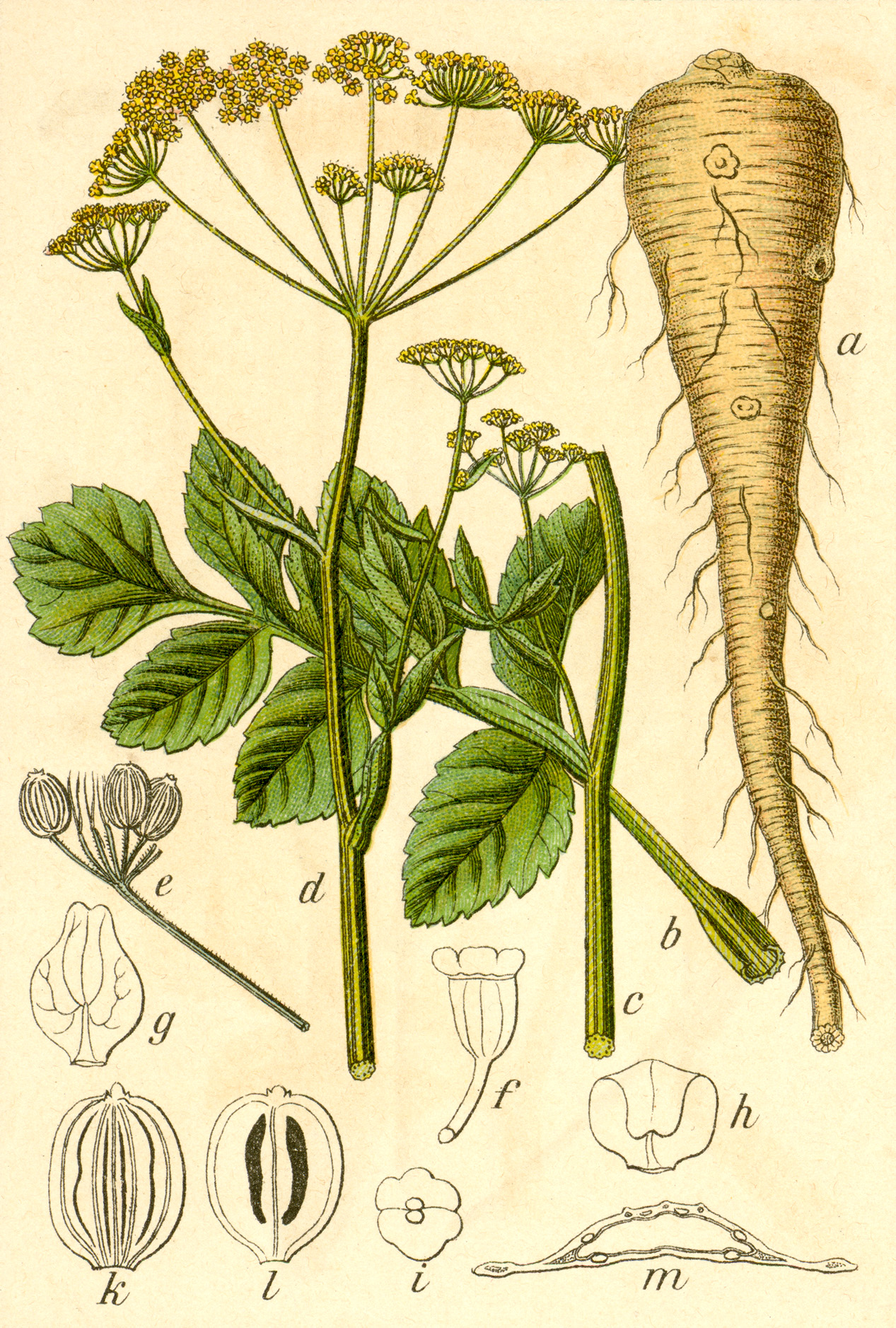
Pastinaca sativa (paprastasis pastarnokas) was a popular food before the appearance of potatoes. K.Donelaitis in his poem The Seasons promoted growing of parsnips.

== Fruit ==
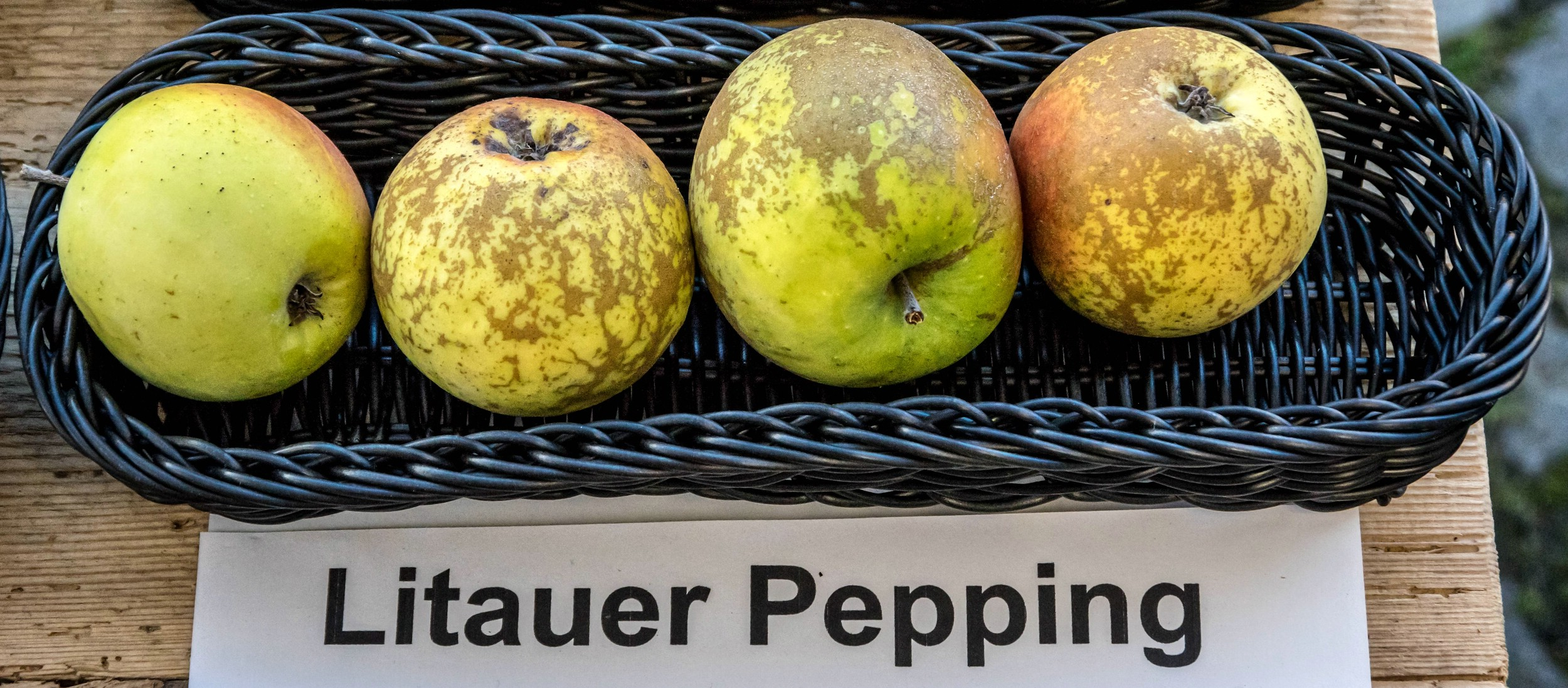
Lietuvos pepinas apple sort

Apples, plums, and pears, which grow well in Lithuania, are the most commonly used fruit. Because they cannot tolerate frost, tropical fruit such as citrus, bananas and pineapples must be imported, and hence were used less often in the past; however, these fruits are now becoming more typical and are widely consumed. During the autumn harvest, fruit is often simmered and spiced to create fruit stews (kompots). Gooseberries (agrastai) and currants (serbentai) are widely cultivated; they are sweetened, made into jams and baked goods, and provide a piquant touch to desserts. Small local producers make fine fruit wines from raspberries, and especially blackcurrants; apple icewine is also produced. Apple cheese, which is considered a dessert, is very popular in autumn. Oldest apple cheese recipe in Lithuania was found in the book of Radvila family chef from the 17th century. Sea buckthorn is used for juice and as a garnish.

== Meat ==
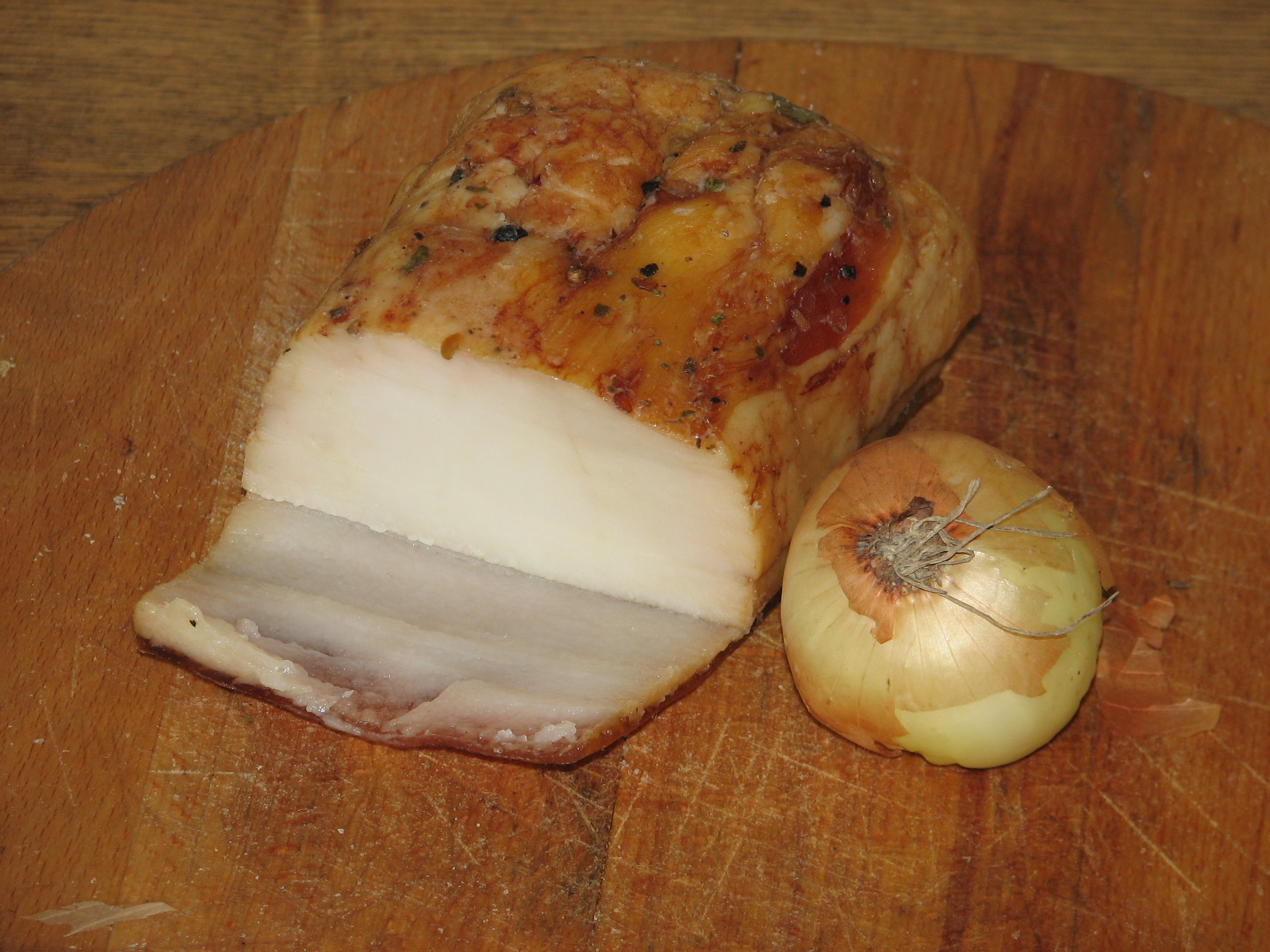
A small slab of lašiniai with an onion

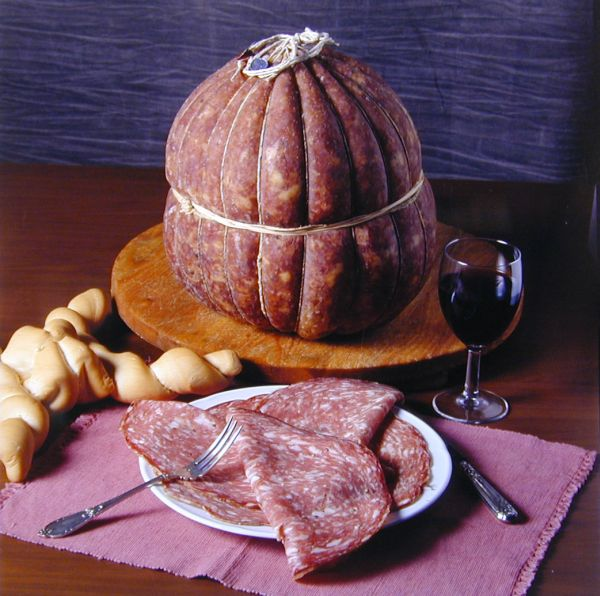
Skilandis is a Lithuanian matured sausage made of meat, fat, salt, pepper and garlic.

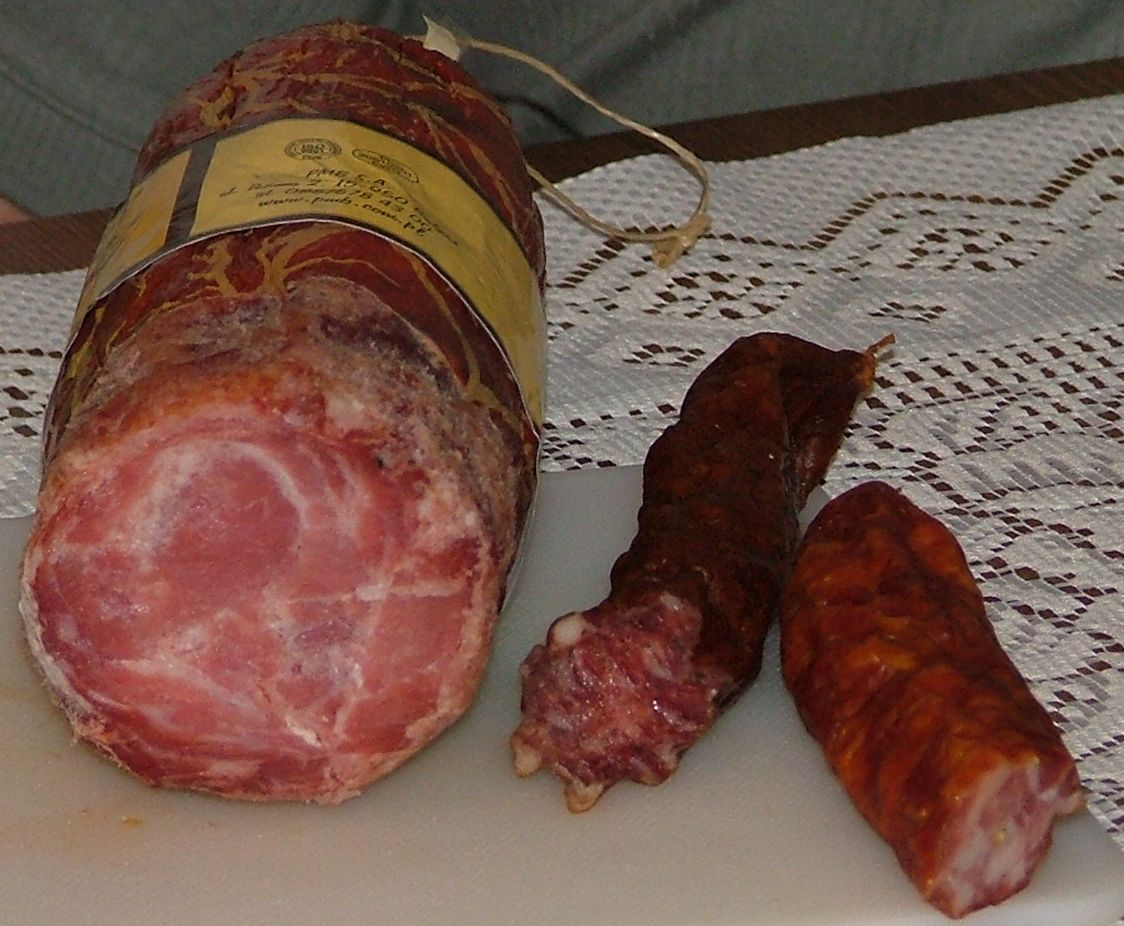
Skilandis and dešros (sausages)

The most frequently used meat is pork, followed by beef, lamb, chicken, turkey, and duck; for immediate consumption it is often grilled, or dusted with breadcrumbs and sauteed, in a dish similar to schnitzel. For bigger gatherings, oven roasts are prepared. The need for meat preservation no longer presents the urgency that it did during the Soviet occupation or previous times of trouble, but many favorite techniques survive, include brining, salting, drying, and smoking. There are many varieties of smoked pork, including ham and a soft sausage with a large-grained filling; these are served as a main course or thinly sliced in sandwiches. Skilandis is a popular Lithuanian sausage and the original production form has been registered as an EU and UK Traditional Speciality Guaranteed under the name Lietuviškas skilandis. The art of meat smoking has long traditions in Lithuania – the right choice of woods, heat or distance from fire required a mastery. Skilandis was smoked for four weeks in a special room – kaminas – which was used for cooking. Smoking, curing and other meat preparation techniques differ in Lithuanian regions.

== Fish ==
Freshwater fish with the exception of herring was the most popular fish in Lithuania. Fish, such as pike, zander or perch, are often baked whole or stuffed. Herring is marinated, baked, fried, or served in aspic. Since the 19th century, herring was imported to Lithuania from Norway, Stavanger. Salmon is often served with a cream sauce, vegetables, and rice. Before building dams after the Soviet occupation, salmon was quite abundant in Lithuanian rivers.

Smoked fish such as eel or bream are common entrées and appetizers in areas near the Baltic Sea, especially in Neringa.

Crayfish are commonly eaten in the summertime as a delicacy and a side dish served with beer.

== Dairy products ==
Lithuania is known for a high volume of dairy products. Dairy products play an important role in Lithuanian cuisine; curd cheese (similar to cottage cheese) may be sweet, sour, seasoned with caraway, fresh, or cured until semi-soft. Lithuanian butter and cream are unusually rich. Sour cream is so prominent in Lithuanian cuisine that it is eaten with everything—meat, fish, pancakes, soups, desserts, salads, and so on. The sour cream Žemaitiškas kastinys is registered in the EU and UK as a Traditional Speciality Guaranteed (TSG).

Lithuanian curd snacks called sūreliai are common as well. Also, a wide variety of different soured milk products are available in the supermarkets, although some people still prefer making their own soured milk. A Milk Road route was created which leads through important locations of milk production in Lithuania.

=== Milk and milk derivatives ===
There is a large variety of milk products—milk, buttermilk, soured milk, kefir, cream, and yogurt. The most traditional are buttermilk and soured milk, which are eaten with boiled potatoes.

=== Cheese ===
The traditional Lithuanian curd cheese Lietuviškas varškės sūris has been registered as a Protected Geographical Indication (PGI) in the EU and UK. The most popular way of eating Lithuanian non-fermented white cheese is with fresh honey; it can also be cooked with spices and eaten with tea. Food historians estimate that the curd cheese may have been eaten in the country for 4-6 thousand years.

Lithuanians started fermenting hard cheese around the 16th century in the region of Samogitia. Across Samogitian borders, this cheese was known as Lithuanian cheese. Historically there were not many varieties of cheese in Lithuania, due to low levels of lactose intolerance. Milk products were usually consumed fresh, or slightly fermented. Semi-hard cheese Liliputas in 2015 was registered as an EU Protected Geographical Indication (PGI). Hard cheese Džiugas ripens for at least 12 months, is popular among gourmets and being used as to flavour recipes. Džiugas in 2019 was registered as a Protected Geographical Indication. In the interwar period Šėta was famous for its cheese, which was made in sūrinė (cheese house). Small family farms throughout Lithuania also producing various types of artisan cheeses being sold in eco and farmer markets, restaurants.

== Regional cuisine ==
Lithuania consists of five regions: Lithuania Minor (Mažoji Lietuva), Samogitia (Žemaitija), Aukštaitija, Suvalkija, and Dzūkija.

Lithuania Minor was famous for its fish, mainly freshwater, which was smoked, salted, roasted, and dried. The best-known fish soup in Lithuania, similar to bouillabaisse, is also prepared in Lithuania Minor. Samogitia is known for its abundant varieties of porridge, crayfish, kastinis and a herring-onion soup, cibulinė. Aukštaitija is known for potato dishes and vėdarai; Northern Aukštaitija is best known as a beer region of Lithuania. Suvalkija is known for quality smoked meat, with a variety of woods being used to impart subtle flavours, with some products being smoked up to one month. Dzūkija, the most forested region, is known for mushrooms, berries, buckwheat dishes such as buckwheat cake (grikinė boba), and boletus soup. Meat curing by smoking is not practiced in Dzûkija. Instead, the salted cuts of meat remain in brine or are hung and air-dried.

Different types of woods were used for smoking the meat; in Samogitia and Aukštaitija, alder tree in combination with juniper was used, but only alder in Suvalkija.

== Formal meal structure ==
A structure of a Lithuanian meal in its full form, usually performed during festivities.

Cold table

Slices of meat charcuterie, small types of salad, herring will be offered. The meal is usually cold, not warm. Several types of various cold dishes will be served to choose from. It could be accompanied with some appetizer such as bitter liquor.

Soup

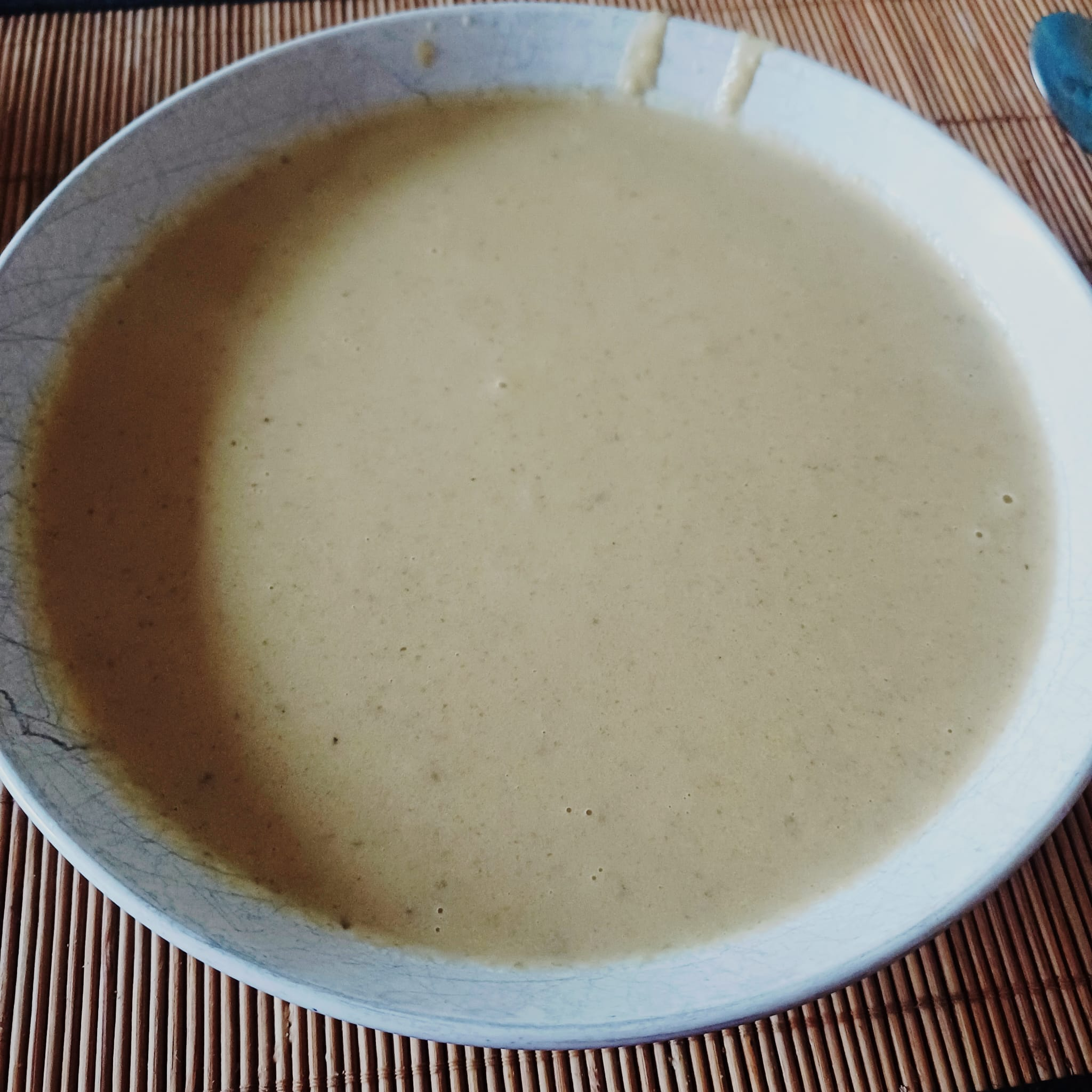
Lithuanian mushroom soup

Soup is a very important part of Lithuania cuisine. Although it does not get much attention as the main dish, its purpose is to be pleasant and revitalizing.

Main dish

Main dish is served hot. It could be roasted chicken, beef or a type of main dish which the host is the most proud to present to the guests. Beer or wine will be offered with the main dish.

Dessert

Dessert is served after some time after the main dish. It could be some sort of cake or curd with berries or jam.

Coffee or tea

Coffee or tea could be served along with dessert or separately.

Digestive

If guests are spending time at the table having interesting conversations digestive or more coffee or tea will be offered.

The meal structure of the day is also influenced by the ancient life in the farm or village. Usual workday was split into three parts - the work from the early morning till breakfast (pusryčiai), work before breakfast and dinner (pietūs) and work between dinner and evening meal (vakarienė). Breakfast was considered the most filling meal, dinner was considered a lighter meal and the evening meal was the lightest. In the summer then the workday was the longest, light meal before breakfast (priešpusryčiai) and the meal before dinner and evening meal - pavakariai was provided. Up to this day Lithuanians eat quite filling breakfast and really light evening meals.

== Typical dishes ==
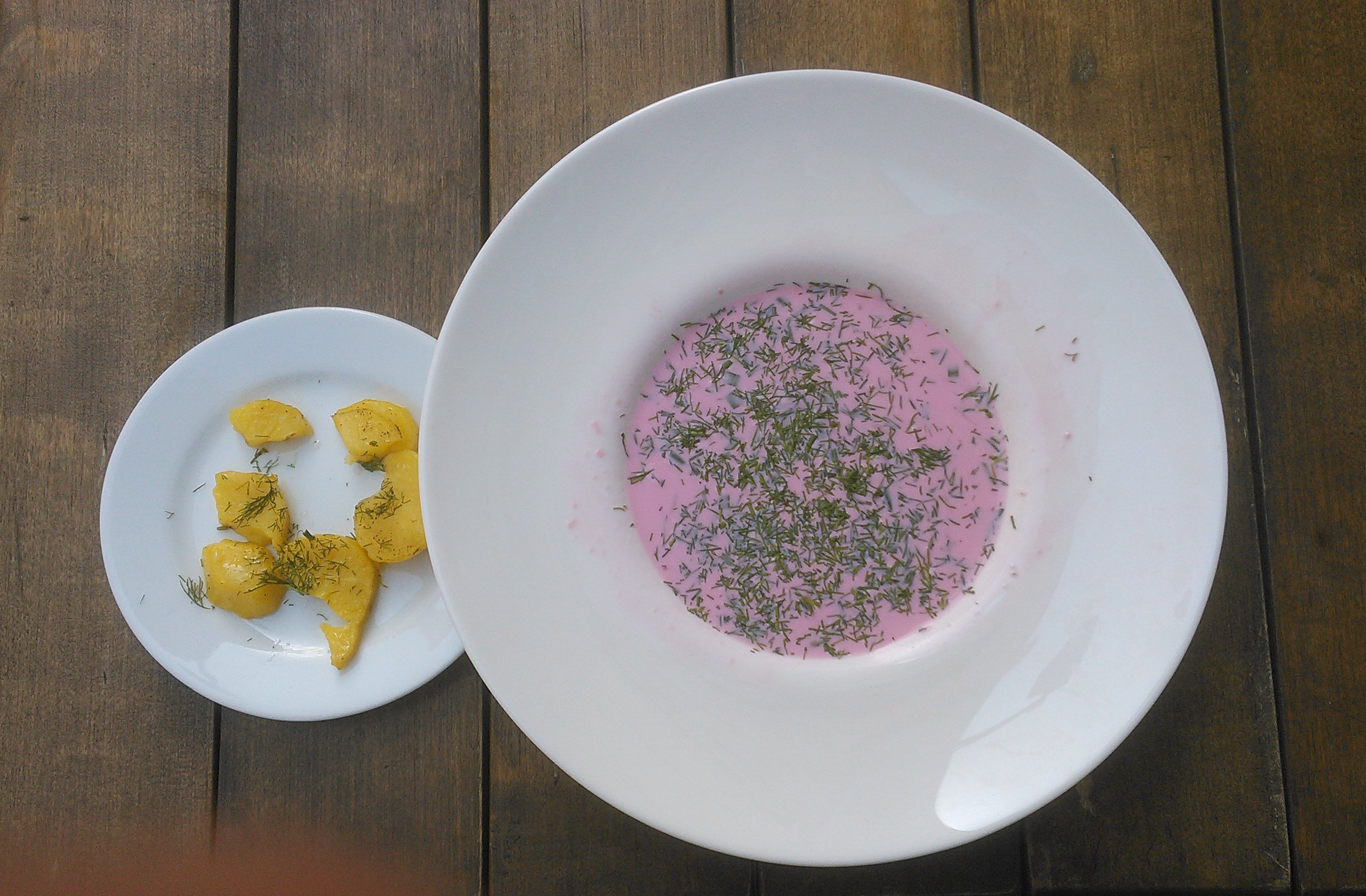
The pink colour of traditional Lithuanian cold beet soup. Often eaten with a hot boiled potato, sour cream and dill.

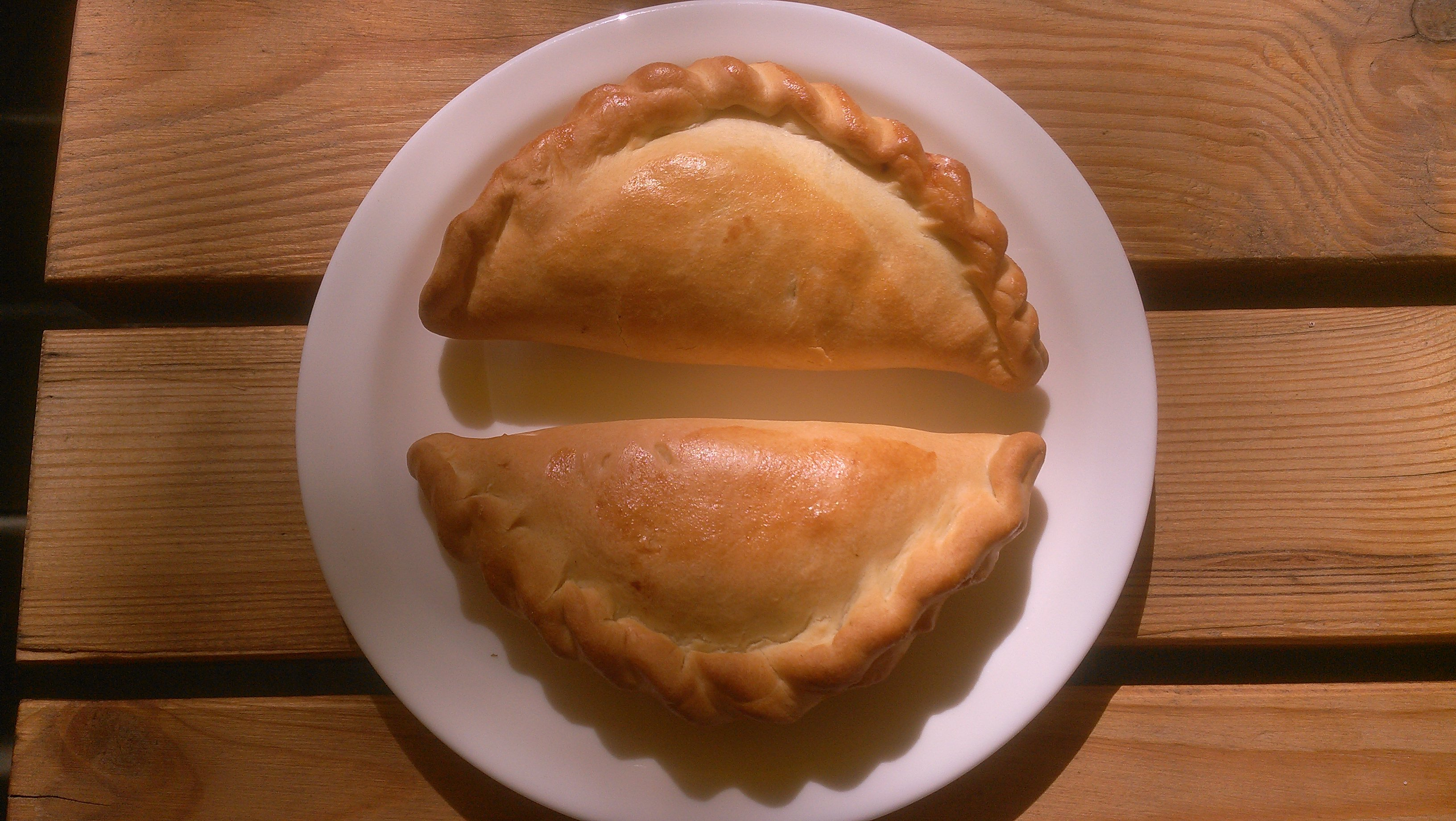
Kibinai

=== Starters and side dishes ===
- Kepta duona (fried bread) – black bread fried in oil and rubbed with garlic, often served with beer or an alcoholic beverage of some sort. Is a distant cousin of French pain à l'ail.
- Įdaryti kiaušiniai – hard-boiled eggs are split, stuffed and garnished; similar to deviled eggs.
- Įdaryti pomidorai – tomatoes are cut in half and filled with a savory stuffing.
- Piršteliai prie alaus – these "little fingers" are thin, rolled-up puff pastries served with beer.
- Lašiniai (lard) – (smoked non-rendered pork underskin fat with a small layer of meat of or without it) is a popular appetizer in villages where it is produced locally, and is usually consumed in the form of a sandwich with unbuttered dark rye bread and bulb onions, horseradish or other vegetables and condiments. Spirgai (cracklings) are made from lard for various sauces similar to gravy. One can find various types of lašiniai in every butcher shop or shop mall in Lithuania.

=== Soups and main dishes ===
- Bulvinių kukulių sriuba – minced potatoes formed into small balls, and boiled in milk. These are usually made from the same potato mixture used in cepelinai.
- Cabbage soup (kopūstienė) flavored with carrots, ham, onions, sauerkraut or all of these and boiled with lard.
- Cucumber soup – the broth is pureed with cucumbers and sweet or sour cream, often garnished with dill.
- Juka – blood soup from the southern region of Lithuania.
- Lapienė – greens such as sorrel or spinach are braised and added to a creamy broth.
- Kankolienė, zacirka – milk soup with dough balls made from flour or potato.
- Sauerkraut soup – often seasoned with pork, carrots, onions, and bay leaves.
- Barščiai – hot borscht (beet soup); it is served uncreamed or blended with sour cream or buttermilk; sometimes chopped Boletus mushrooms are added.
- Šaltibarščiai – cold summer soup based on beets and milk kefir or sour milk, colored a shocking pink. It is made with cooked or pickled shredded beets and various other chopped vegetables, such as cucumber, dill, or green onions. Hot boiled potatoes, cold sour cream, and diced hard-boiled eggs are often served alongside to add color, texture, and thermal contrast. The older traditional version of šaltibarščiai was simply white without beets.
- Vištienos sultinys – chicken broth is always popular, especially for the elderly and ill.
- Maltiniai or frikadėlės (frikadeller) – soft minced meat and onion patties, often served with potatoes, sliced cucumber, dill pickle and/or grated beats and a sauce.
- Manų putra/košė – Semolina wheat porridge/pudding topped with butter, cinnamon, sugar and/or berries. It is common as a breakfast dish or as a dessert.
- Šaltiena or košeliena (aspic or meat jelly) – many savory foodstuffs are presented in gelatin molds; horseradish is often served as a condiment.
- Blynai or lietiniai, sklindžiai – although blynai is often translated as pancakes, they are usually more similar to crepes. They are either wafer-thin, as crepes are, or made from a yeast-risen batter, often mixed with grated apple or potato.

- Kėdainių blynai – grated raw potato pancakes, similar to latkes.
- Žemaičių blynai – similar to Kėdainių blynai, made from boiled potatoes and filled with chopped cooked meat
- Lietiniai – large, usually square thin crepes filled with minced meat, curd with cinnamon, or minced sauteed mushrooms.
- Buckwheat pancakes – traditional dish in Dzūkija

- Balandėliai (little doves) – cabbage leaves stuffed with meat and braised.
- Dešra – sausages are made in many different ways: they may be smoked or fresh, and include pork, beef, potatoes, or barley; in rural areas, blood may be added.
- Didžkukuliai or cepelinai (zeppelins) – potato dumplings stuffed with meat, mushrooms, or cheese, often garnished with spirgai, fried minced onion and bacon or sour cream. Cepelinai is a distant cousin of German ''Kartoffelkloesse'' and Norwegian "potetball".

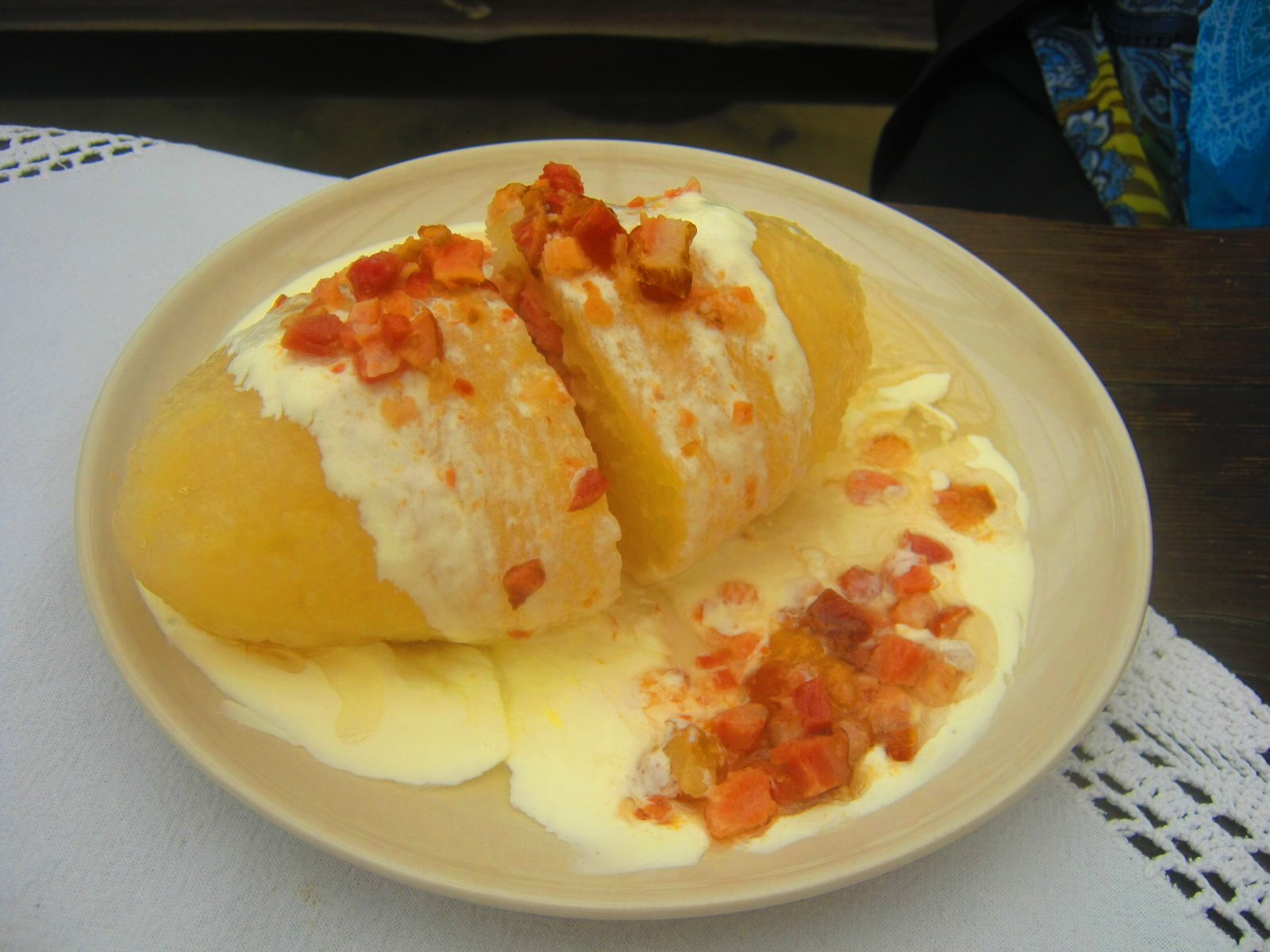
Cepelinai, a potato-based dumpling dish characteristic of Lithuanian cuisine

- Kastinys – sour cream "butter"; sour cream is kneaded and washed until it forms a soft spread. A traditional dish in Samogitia.

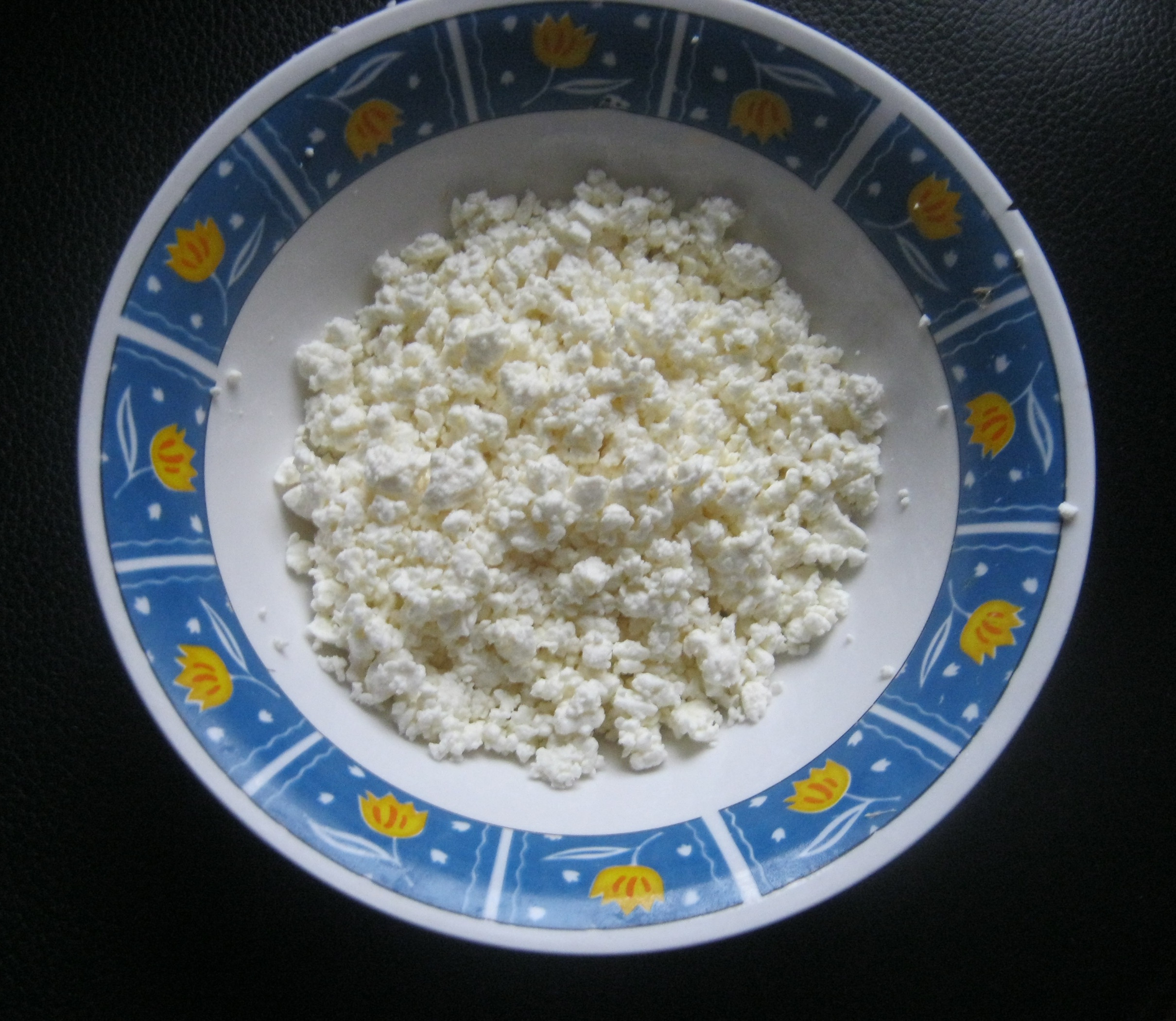
Homemade curd – varškė

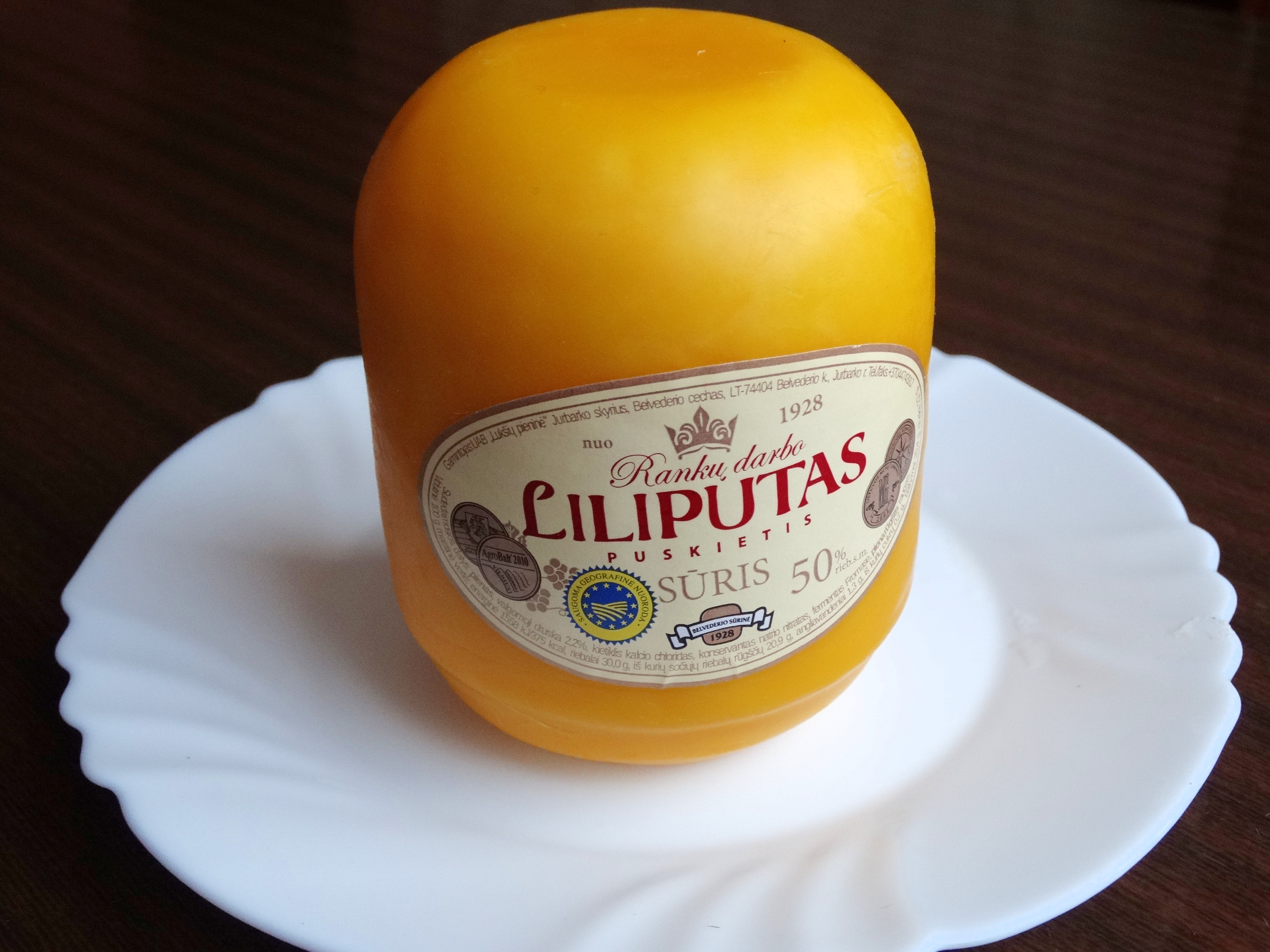
Lithuanian semi-hard cheese liliputas, PGI

- Kibinai – pastry with mutton and onions, a Karaite dish.
- Kukuliai – potato dumplings similar to gnocchi.
- Koldūnai, virtiniai, auselės – these are various kinds of dumplings, filled with minced meat, sausage, cottage cheese, or mushrooms, usually garnished with crumbled fried bacon. They are similar to Polish pierogi or kołduny, but are usually smaller. Koldūnai were introduced to Lithuania with Tatars, who were invited to settle by Vytautas the Great.
- Šaltanosiai – literally "cold nose ones". Similar to koldūnai or virtiniai – they are being eaten lukewarm or cold with blueberry jam. Lithuanian name šaltanosiais was borrowed in Polish, German and Belarusian languages.
- Kugelis (also bulvių plokštainis, the lexically correct non-foreign name, literally "flat potato dish" or banda – this usage predominates in the Dzūkija region) – potato pudding made with grated potatoes and eggs. It is usually served with sour cream or spirgai. Also served with diced bacon and diced onion cooked in the bacon fat.
- Šaltnosiukai (cold little noses) – dumplings filled with lingonberries, not found anywhere outside Lithuania.
- Skilandis or Kindziukas – pig stomach stuffed with meat and garlic and cold-smoked.
- Suktiniai (beef birds) – beef or pork is pounded until very thin, filled and rolled up, and braised. An example of this is zrazai, which are Lithuanian beef rolls. See image at right.
- Švilpikai – an oven-baked potato snaps.
- Šiupinys (Hodge-Podge) – a stew made from a variety of ingredients – groats, peas, beans, potatoes, meat, rye flour. Various different combinations are preferred in different regions of Lithuania.
- Troškinti rauginti kopūstai – a stew made with sauerkraut and the cook's choice of meats and vegetables.
- Vėdarai – large intestine of a domestic pig stuffed with grated potato mash (bulviniai vėdarai) or with a mixture made from pork blood, barley groats and dried mint (Kraujiniai vėdarai).

=== Desserts ===
Lithuanian-style cakes (pyragas) are often baked in a rectangular pan and sometimes have an apple, plum, apricot, or other fruit baked in; they are less frequently iced than is customary in the United States. These cakes are cut into squares for serving. Poppy seed is sometimes used as a swirl filling in dessert bread (Poppy seed roll and šimtalapis) and as a flavoring in other pastries.

For special occasions, torte may be prepared; they often consist of 10 to 20 layers, filled with jam and vanilla, chocolate, mocha, or rum buttercreams; they are lavishly decorated. Lithuanian coffeehouses (kavinė) serve a variety of tortes and pastries to attract evening strollers.

Desserts include:

- Žagarėliai (also known as krustai or chrustai) – Twisted, thin deep-fried pastries dusted with powdered sugar; identical to Scandinavian Klejner cookies, similar to Mexican buñuelo.
- Kūčiukai or šližikai – very small rolls are baked and served with poppyseed milk; this is a traditional Kūčios' (Christmas Eve) dish.
- Ledai – ice cream is served everywhere in the summer.
- Spurgos – a Lithuanian variant of doughnuts, sometimes filled with preserves. The main difference from doughnuts or berliners is that the Lithuanian version uses curd as a basis. Therefore, they often called varškės spurgos – curd doughnuts.
- Šakotis (also called raguotis) – is essentially a pound cake grilled layer by layer, with a very distinctive branching form. It is a Lithuanian variant of a spit cake which is a distant cousin of the German Baumkuchen, the French gâteau à la broche, the Swedish spättekaka. Some sources attribute its invention to Yotvingians – ancient, now extinct Baltic tribe. Šakotis is a frequent accent of Lithuanian weddings and bigger festivities.
- Šimtalapis (one hundred sheets) – introduced to Lithuania with Tatars brought by Vytautas the Great and modified locally, is made from laminated dough which is separated with layers of melted butter – the principle is very similar to that of croissants.
- Tinginys – prepared with biscuits or crackers, cocoa, butter, sugar and solidified milk
- Skruzdėlynas (anthill) – consists of individual pastries stacked on top of one another, sprinkled with poppy seeds and glazed with honey and nuts.
- Fresh cucumbers with honey – typical summer dessert, especially on the countryside.
- Grybukai - A mushroom-shaped baked dough coated with chocolate and white icing. The dough can be rather stiff sponge cake, gingerbread or biscuit.
- Kuršėnų vyniotinis - Traditional Lithuanian sponge roll filled with sweet, creamy curd cheese.
- Draugystės pyragas - Means “Friendship Cake" usually soft, sweet and filled with delicious layers of cottage cheese cream and jam.
- Grietiniečiai - Pastries filled with sweet cottage cheese, made with sour cream dough and dusted with icing sugar.
Desserts

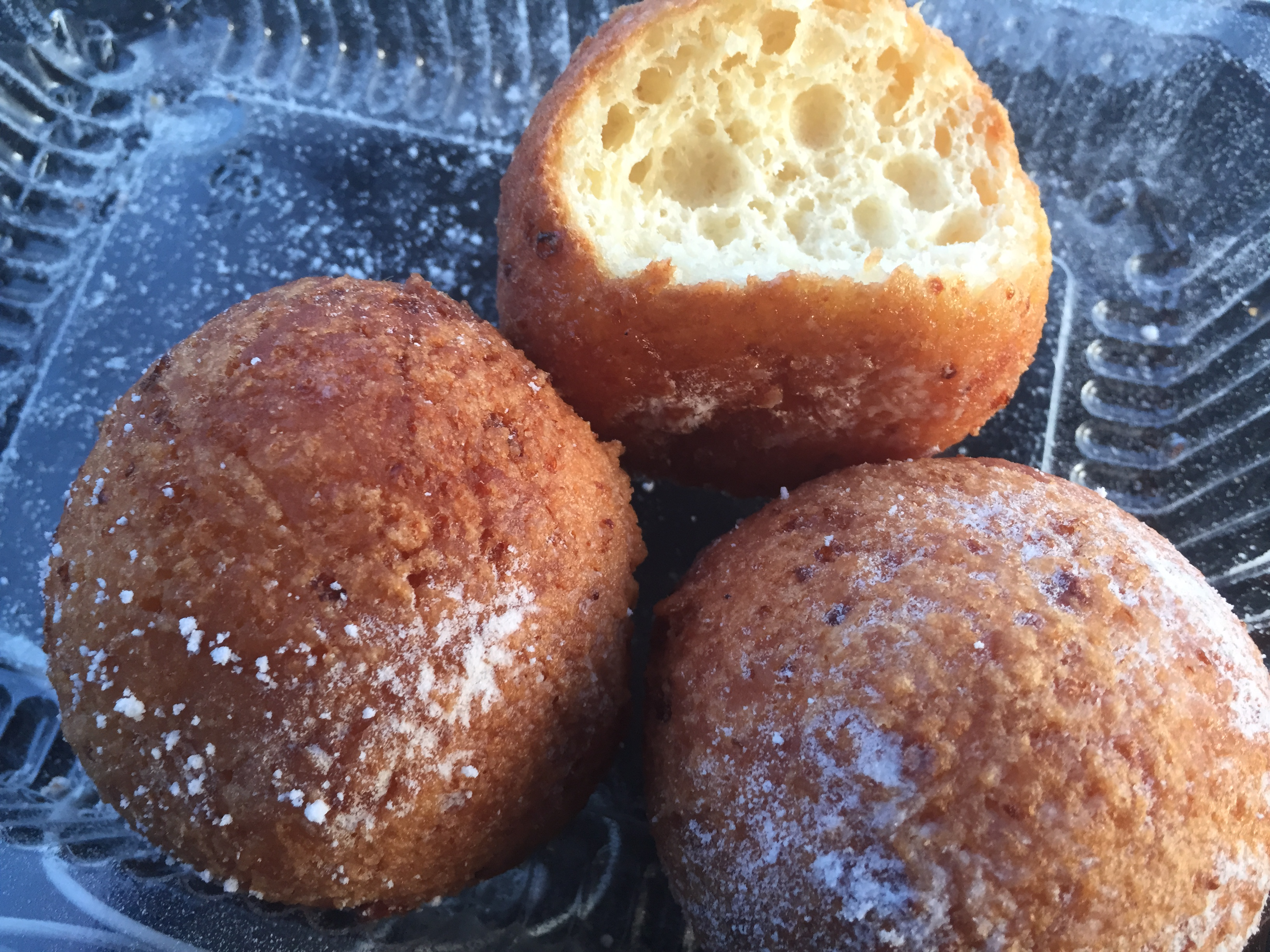
Lithuanian curd doughnuts – spurgos

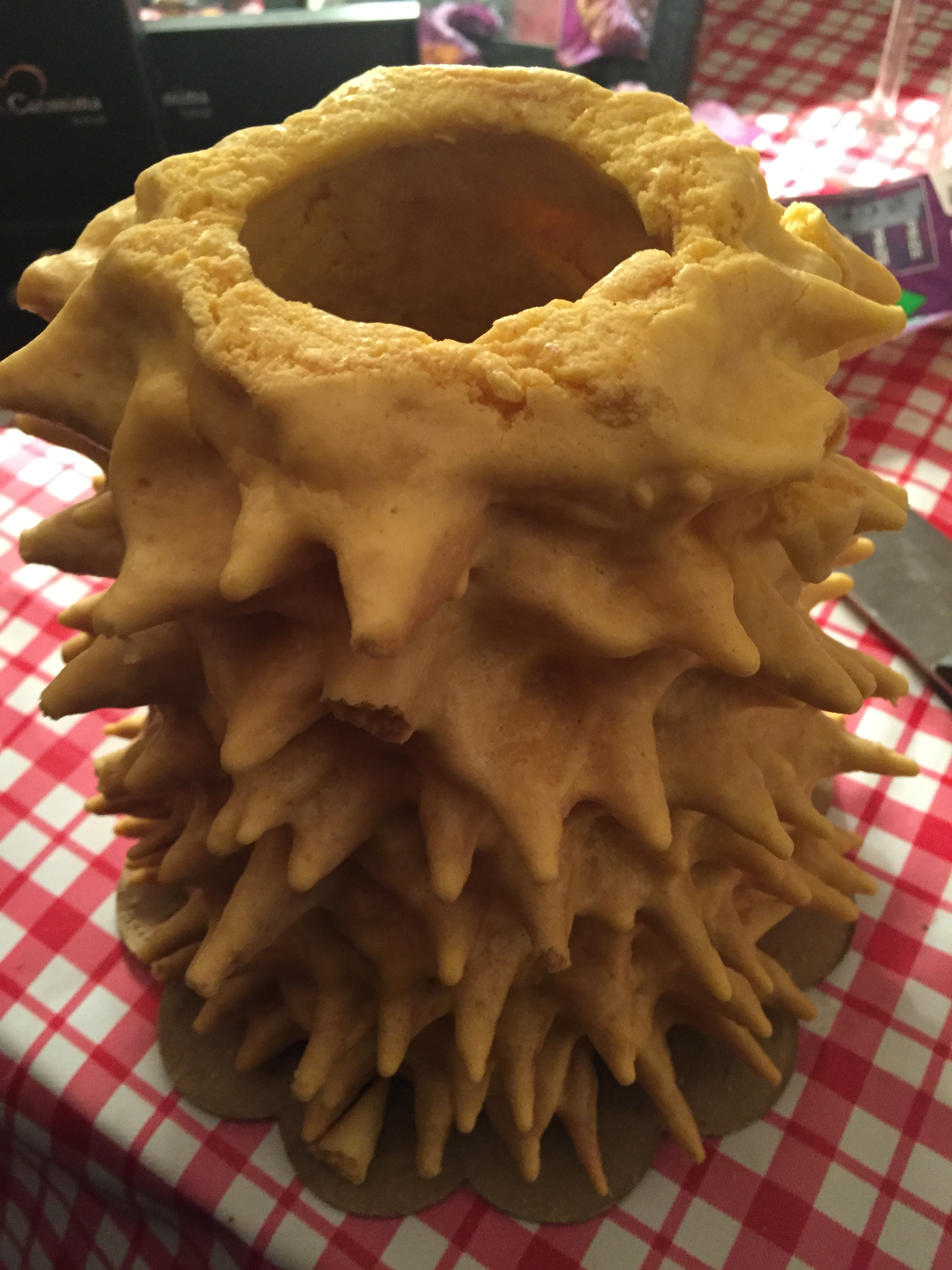
Šakotis, a spit cake is one of the main attributes of the Lithuanian feast.

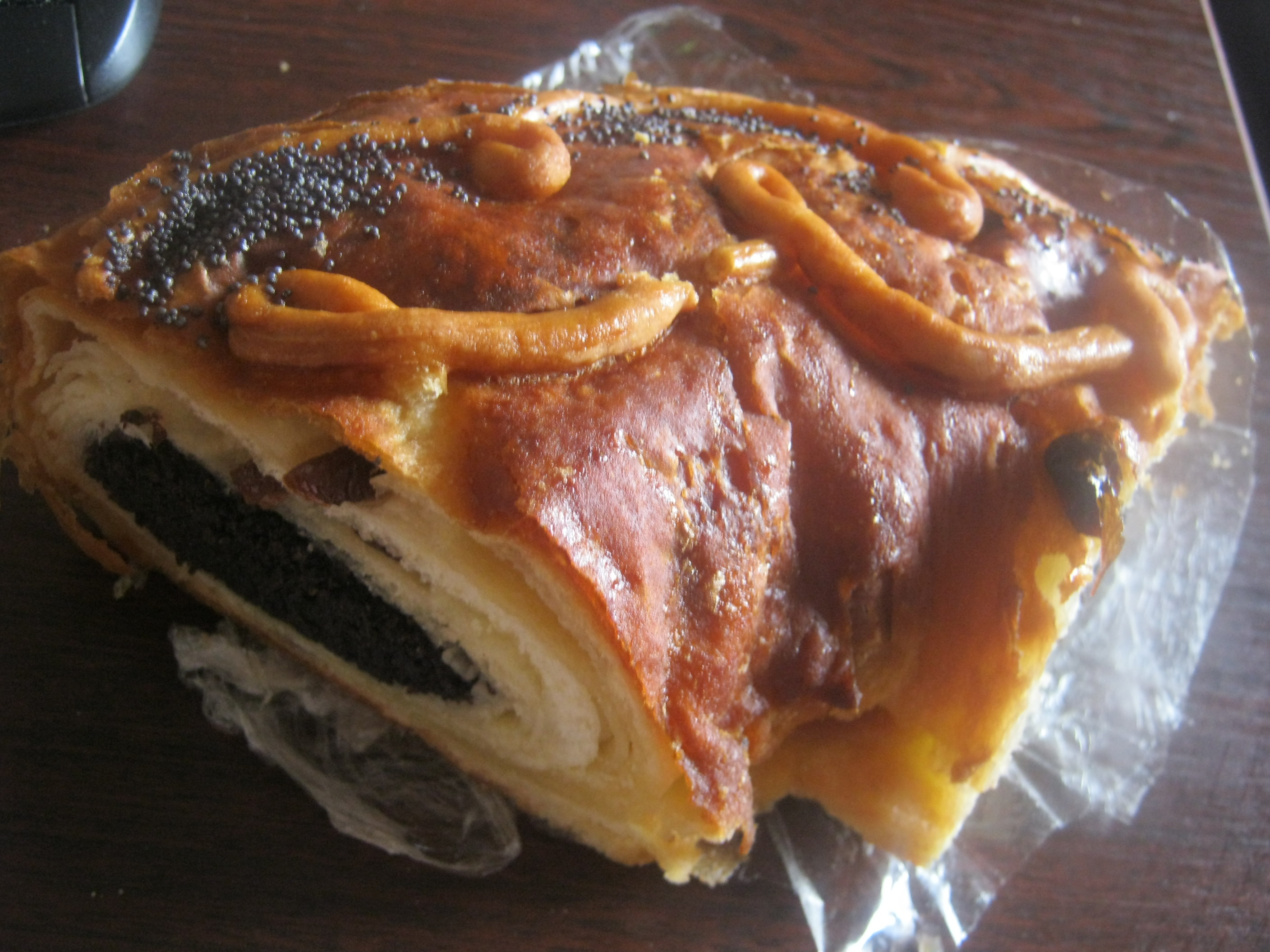
Šimtalapis

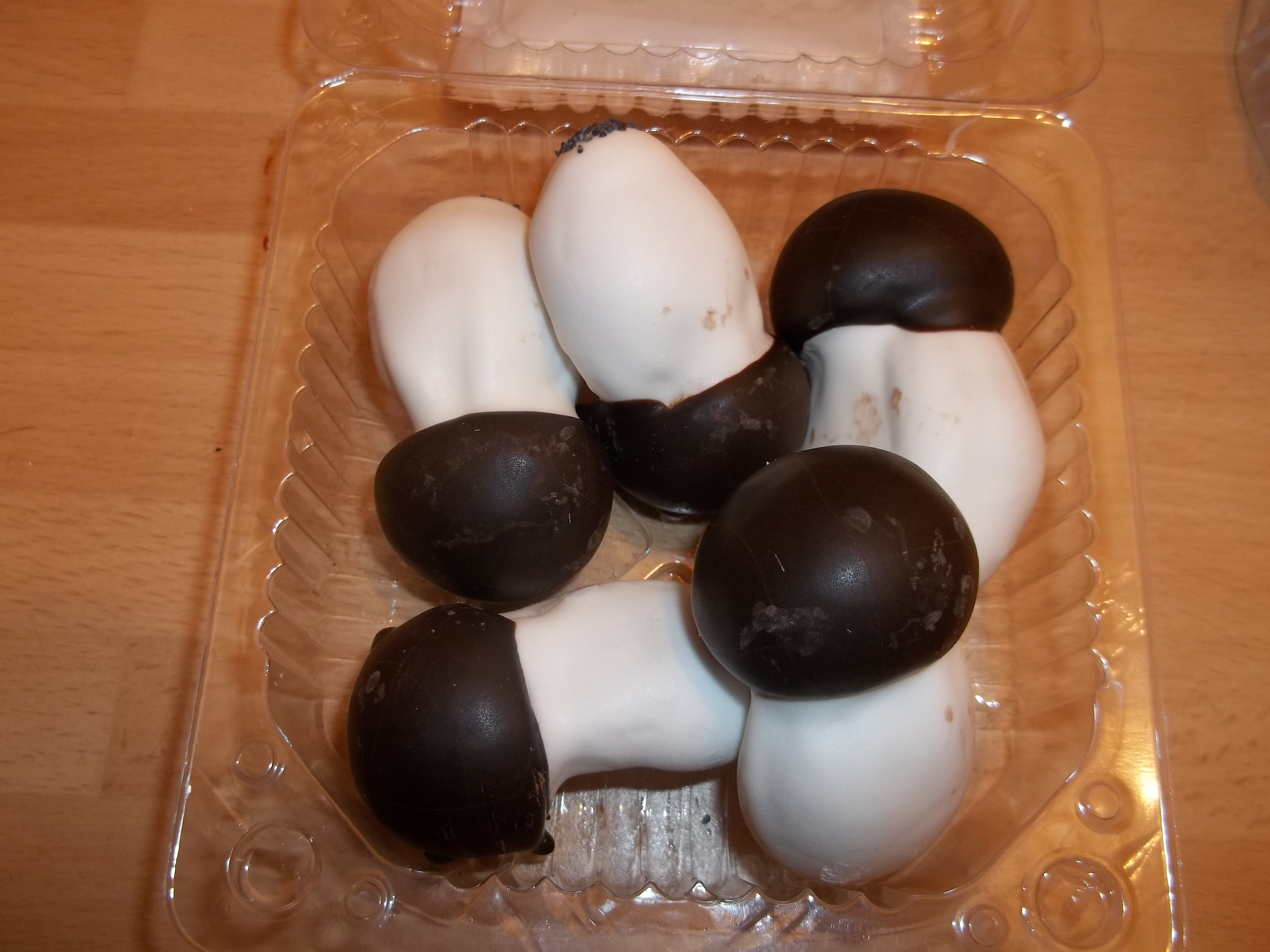
A mushroom-shaped baked dough, grybukai.

== Drinks ==
=== Beer ===
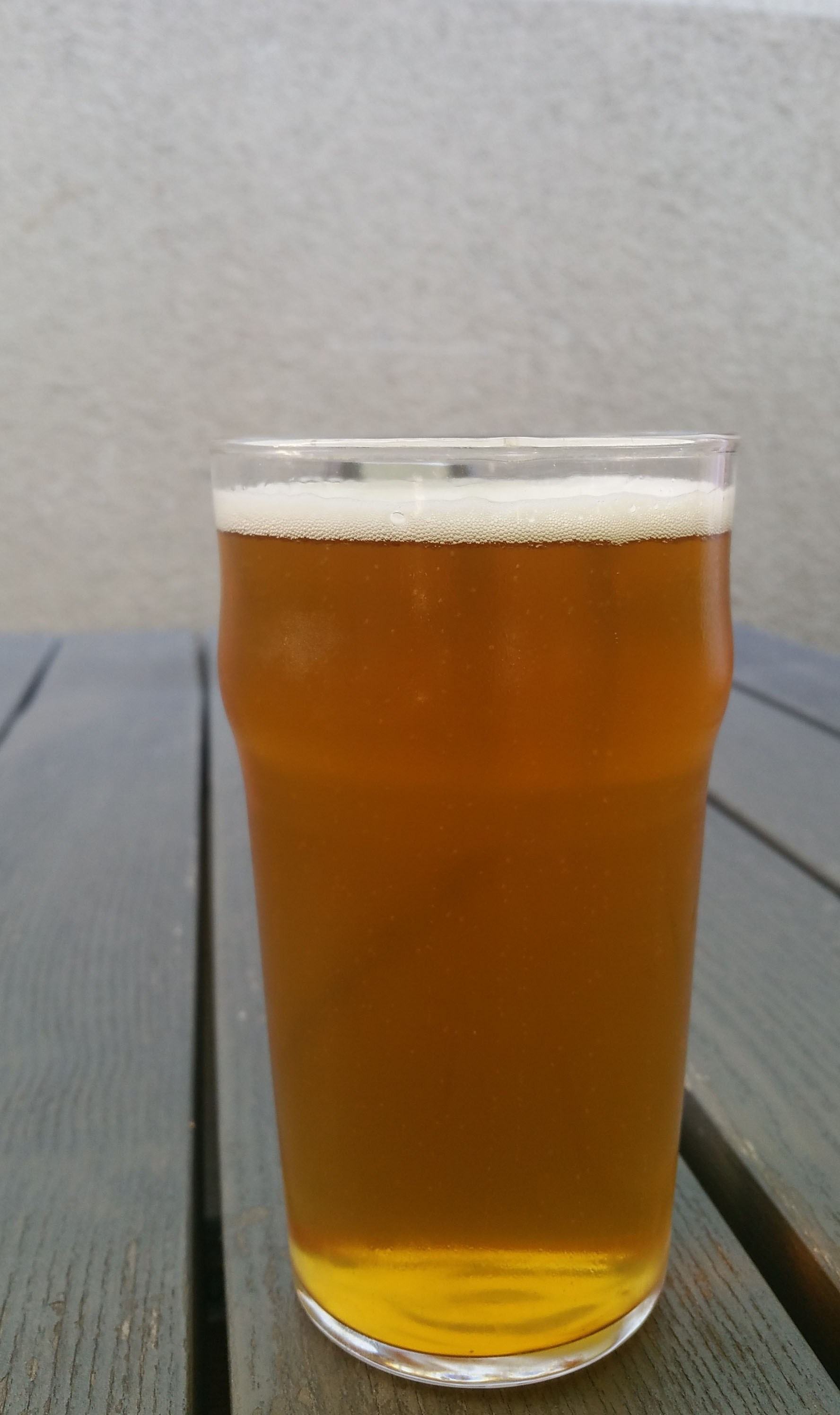
Traditional Lithuanian beer has an earthy and yeasty flavour, rich colour of the clay or straw.

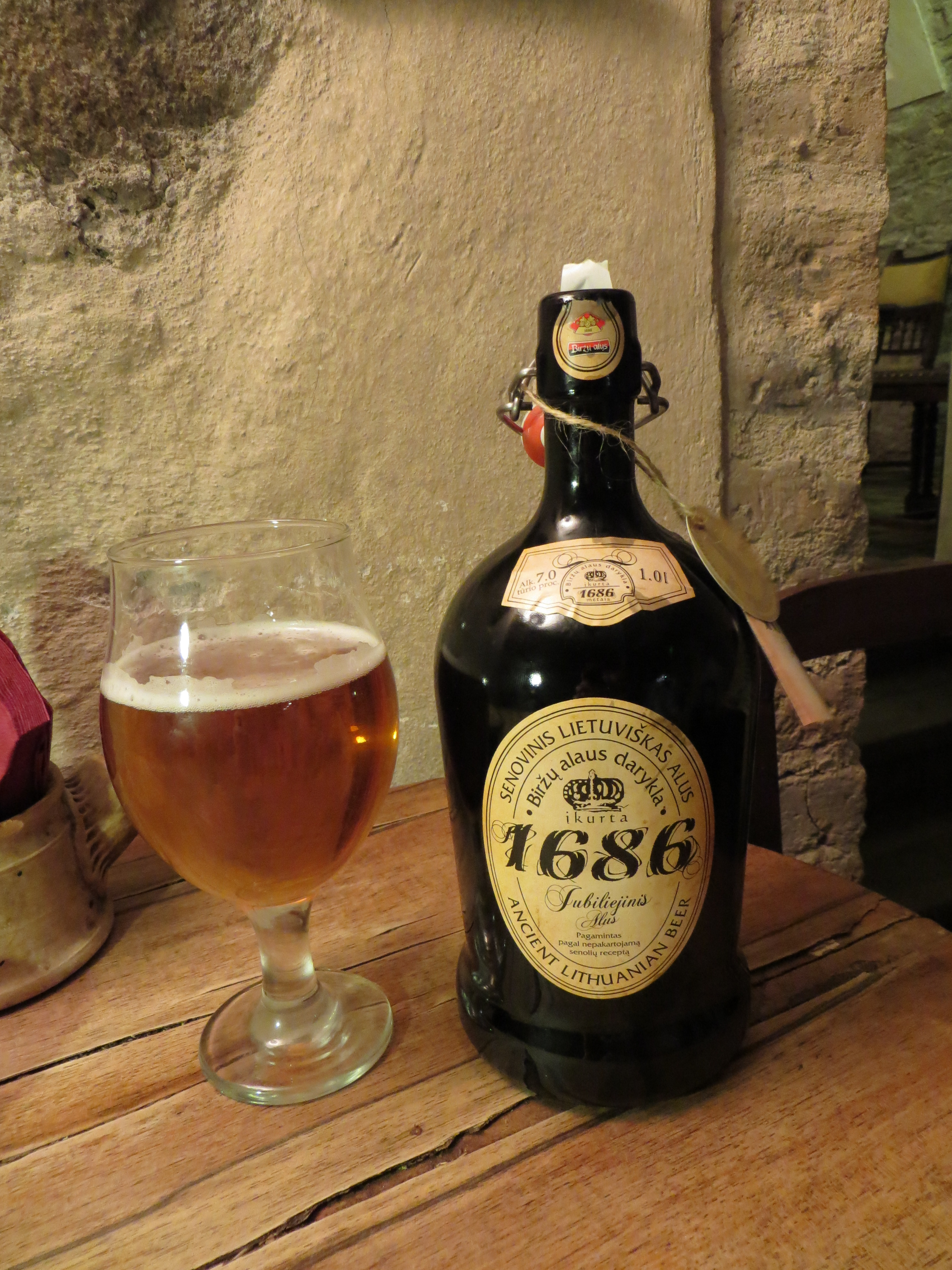
Biržų alus. Biržai region is known for traditional-recipe beer breweries.

Alus (beer) is extremely popular throughout the country, especially again since the restoration of the Independence in 1990. Several Lithuanian beers have won international awards. Local breweries are enjoying a renaissance. Beer is the most common alcoholic beverage. Lithuania has a long farmhouse beer tradition, first mentioned in 11th-century chronicles. Beer was brewed for ancient Baltic festivities and rituals. Ancient Lithuanian god for brewing beer and mead was Ragutis or Rūgutis. 21 September was known as the festive Alutinis, Koštuvės or Ragautuvės; the first beer was made using the harvest of the running year. Lithuania is not very well known for its beer worldwide, but it is one of the few countries in Europe to have an independent beer tradition in which breweries do not simply brew beers in styles developed elsewhere. Traditional farmhouse brewing has survived into the present day in Lithuania, and during Soviet times such brewing started to be expanded to a larger scale. After independence, this process gathered speed and soon there were more than 200 breweries in the country. Many of these have since gone out of business, but Lithuania still has about 80 breweries, of which perhaps 60-70 produce beers in styles unknown in the rest of the world. Some of these are very close to the traditional brews made by farmers, while others have developed out of that tradition as a consequence of the growth of the traditional brewers into reasonably large regional breweries.

Farmhouse brewing survived to a greater extent in Lithuania than anywhere else, and through accidents of history the Lithuanians then developed a commercial brewing culture from their unique farmhouse traditions. Lithuania is top 5 by consumption of beer per capita in Europe in 2015, counting 75 active breweries, 32 of them are microbreweries.

The microbrewery scene in Lithuania has been growing in later years, with a number of bars focusing on these beers popping up in Vilnius and also in other parts of the country. Local beers have started to attract international attention after beer bloggers discovered the country, inspiring a major feature article in Beer Connoisseur magazine, prompting the New York Times to list Lithuania as one of the 42 places to visit in 2013 on the strength of the village beers. Beer routes are organized through the main breweries in northern Lithuania.

=== Midus ===
Midus is said to be the most ancient Lithuanian alcoholic beverage; it is a variety of mead made from honey. Baltic people were making midus for thousands of years. One of the first mentionings of Balts and mead was by the 9th-century traveller Wulfstan of Hedeby, who visited Prussians. Old Lithuanian mead was made from a solution of honey and water simmered with various spices, such as thyme, lemon, cinnamon, cherries, linden blossoms, juniper berries, and hops. Oldest recipe of Lithuanian midus was recorded in a book by Olaus Magnus Historia de Gentibus Septentrionalibus, published in Rome in 1555. Midus was considered a drink of nobleman and gentry. Since 16th century midus started to compete with imported vine, but it was known and was still very popular in Palace of the Grand Dukes of Lithuania. Today Midus is produced by several companies and is to be found in the majority of liquor shops. Craft mead producing is also becoming popular. Traditional Lithuanian midus Stakliškės, fermented up to 90 days has a Protected Geographical Indication (PGI) label.

=== Fruit and berry wines ===
Fruit and berry wines being made in Lithuania by several companies. Industrial production of fruit and berry wines was started by Balys Karazija in 1926 in Anykščiai. His wines have won international awards in 1938. Initiatives of B.Karazija made a fruit wine a traditional drink in Lithuania. Currently blueberry, apple, apple ice wine, black currant, aronia, cherry wines being produced by smaller and bigger companies.

=== Other ===
- Arbata (tea) – chamomile, rosehip, thyme and other herbal teas are popular as well as black tea if not more widespread. Many herbal infusions are used for medicinal purposes. Tea parties were popular in the interbellum Lithuania especially among high society.
- Gira (kvass) is a non-alcoholic beverage made by the natural fermentation of wheat, rye, or barley bread, sometimes flavoured with fruit, berries, raisins or birch sap; it is similar to Russian or Ukrainian kvass. Those brewed from rye bread and from caraway seed are popular and distributed in glass bottles. There is also a carbonated soft drink known as gira, which is distributed in plastic bottles, but it shares neither taste nor production technology with the original beverage.
- Sula (birch sap) is a traditional drink, popular in summer.
- Degtinė ("the burn") is the Lithuanian version of vodka, traditionally made from rye. Produced domestically, its quality ranges from basic to triple-distilled.
- Kava (coffee) is brewed in espresso makers or moka pots at home, or with espresso machines in cafes. It is quite strong and usually sweetened. Coffeehouses (kavinė) can be found not only on every street corner in towns but at highway rest stops and at every point of interest. First traditionally Lithuanians roasted oak acorns and made gilių kava (acorn coffee) – a substitute for natural bean coffee which is still sold in a special shops as a delicacy. The first coffeehouses appeared in Lithuania in the 18th century and in 1814 there were 49 coffeehouses in Vilnius. Coffee culture was flourishing in 19th century in Lithuania. It was a prestige to have a special room for coffee drinking and a dedicated person who prepared coffee. First known cafes were established in Ribiškės and Lentvaris manors. Naturalist Georg Forster during his visit in Merkinė already tried coffee in local coffeehouse and wrote about it as of "good quality". Journalist Rapolas Mackonis was explorer of cafe life and wrote about culture of cafes in Vilnius and Kaunas in the 20th century.
- Starka, an aged vodka, as well as Krupnikas, a honey liqueur, are traditional drinks dating from the Polish–Lithuanian Commonwealth in the 16th–18th centuries.
- Trauktinė (a bitter) is a strong herbal vodka; there are many varieties. It is also used as traditional medicine. Trejos devynerios ("999"), steeped with 27 different herbs, is one of the best known.
- Vynas (wine) culture is firmly growing in Lithuania – wineries and specialised wine shops for Italian, French, New World wines operate in biggest cities. The wine exhibition Vyno dienos (Days of Wine) taking place in May, is the largest wine exhibition in Northern Europe. Lithuania historically is a wine importer, since its climate isn't very friendly for growing grapevines.

== Special occasions ==
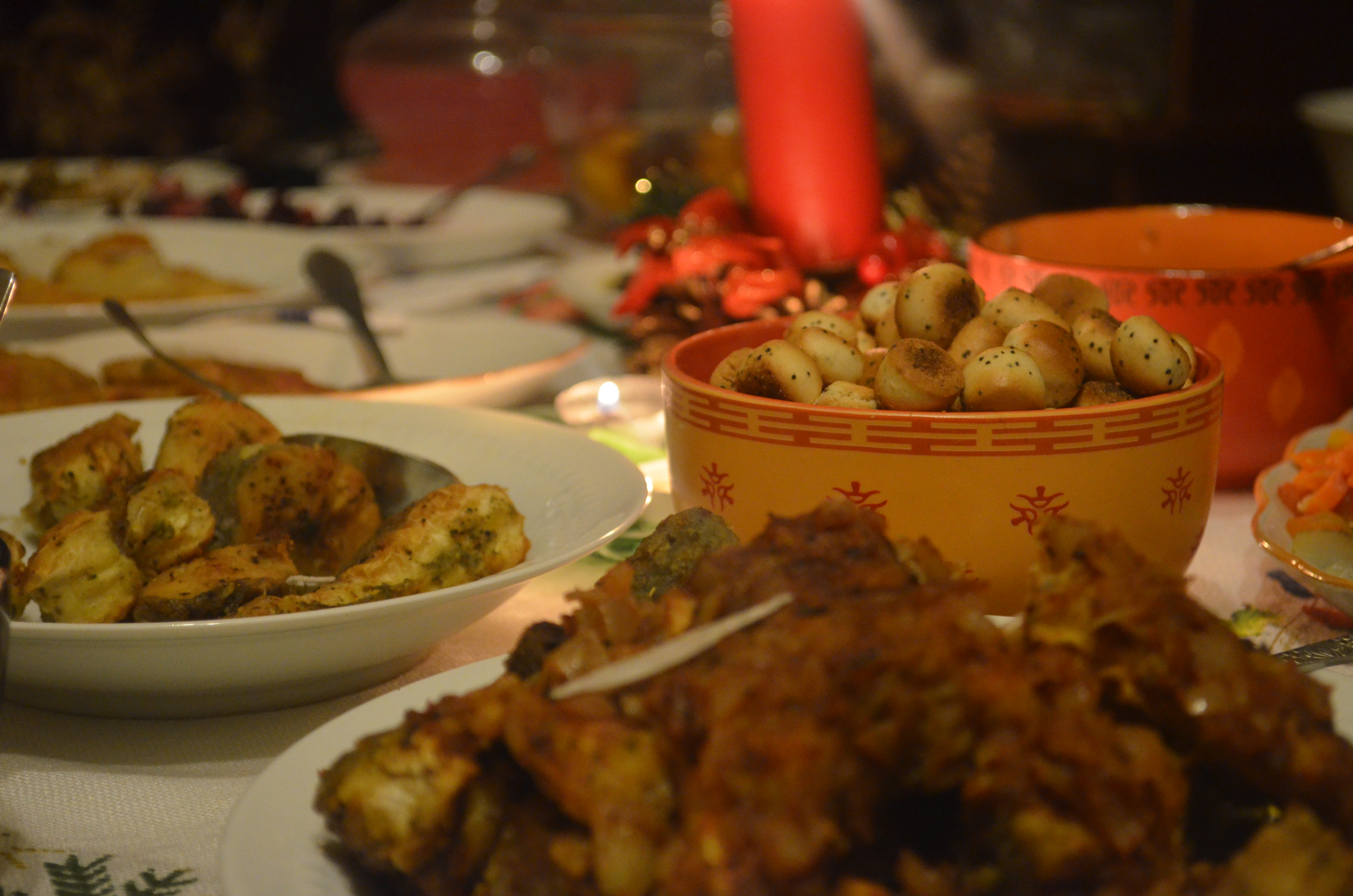
Kūčios (Christmas Eve) table

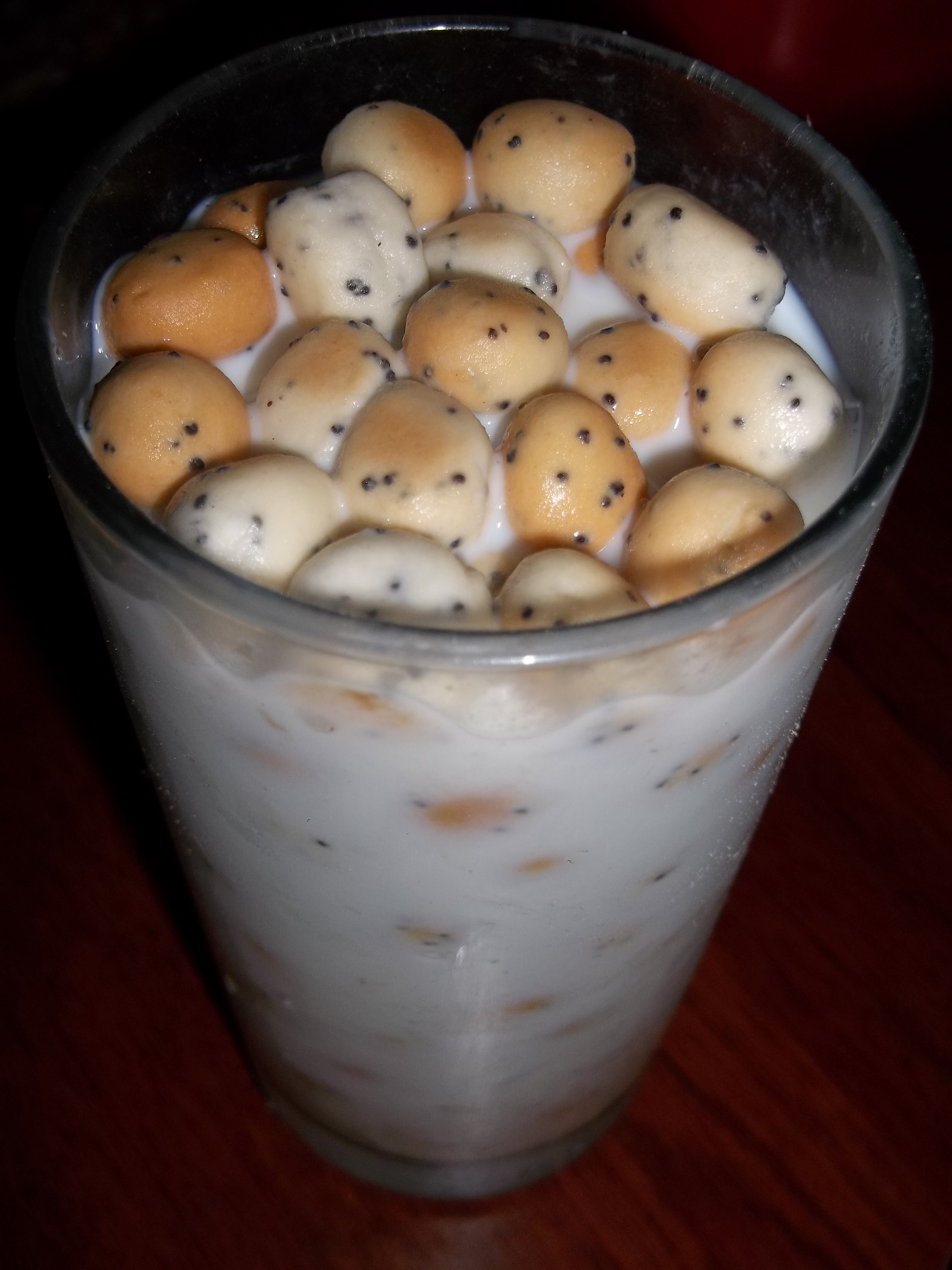
Kūčiukai in milk, a traditional snack during Christmas Eve celebrations

Easter and Christmas (Christmas Eve) are festives which have their own table presentations and type of dishes in Lithuania. Easter tables are decorated with juniper or sallow twigs.

- Easter (Velykos) – The intricately painted Easter eggs that were prepared earlier in the week are eaten for breakfast. The diners touch their eggs together as a sort of toast (among the children, this custom sometimes devolves into a smashing contest). Dinner may be roast goose or ham and accompaniments. Dessert is often a cake made to resemble a birch log, or cookies shaped and decorated as mushrooms.
- Birthdays (Gimtadieniai) – The family's favorite cake is served. Traditionally in Lithuania the day of the saint after whom one was named was celebrated by the family as well as one's own birth date; for instance, a John would celebrate his name day on St. John's Day (Joninės), June 24.
- Christmas Eve (Kūčios) – Twelve dishes are presented on a table spread with hay and lit by candles. No animal products, including dairy products or eggs, can be consumed as part of this meal. However, fish is permitted and regularly forms part of the meal. This custom is widespread in Catholic Eastern Europe, but traditions vary to different families. It is supposed that rituals and servicing of the Christmas Eve table reflect the most ancient Lithuanian traditions.
- Weddings (Vestuvės) – The widest possible variety of courses are served. A special bread is sometimes baked and adorned with flowers and bird-shaped decorations, or a šakotis is decorated. The ideal Lithuanian wedding lasts at least two days, so a great deal of cooking and baking goes on.
- Funerals (Šermenys) – The bereaved family usually hosts a dinner for all the mourners called at a restaurant or other similar venue.
- Informal gatherings and cocktail parties – The hosts often serve small open-faced sandwiches, similar to those at a Scandinavian smorgasbord, topped with smoked fish, sausage, cucumbers, and so forth. Flavored vodkas, which may have been concocted with fruits and herbs according to the host's or hostess's own family recipe, may be served.

== Contemporary cuisine and restaurants ==
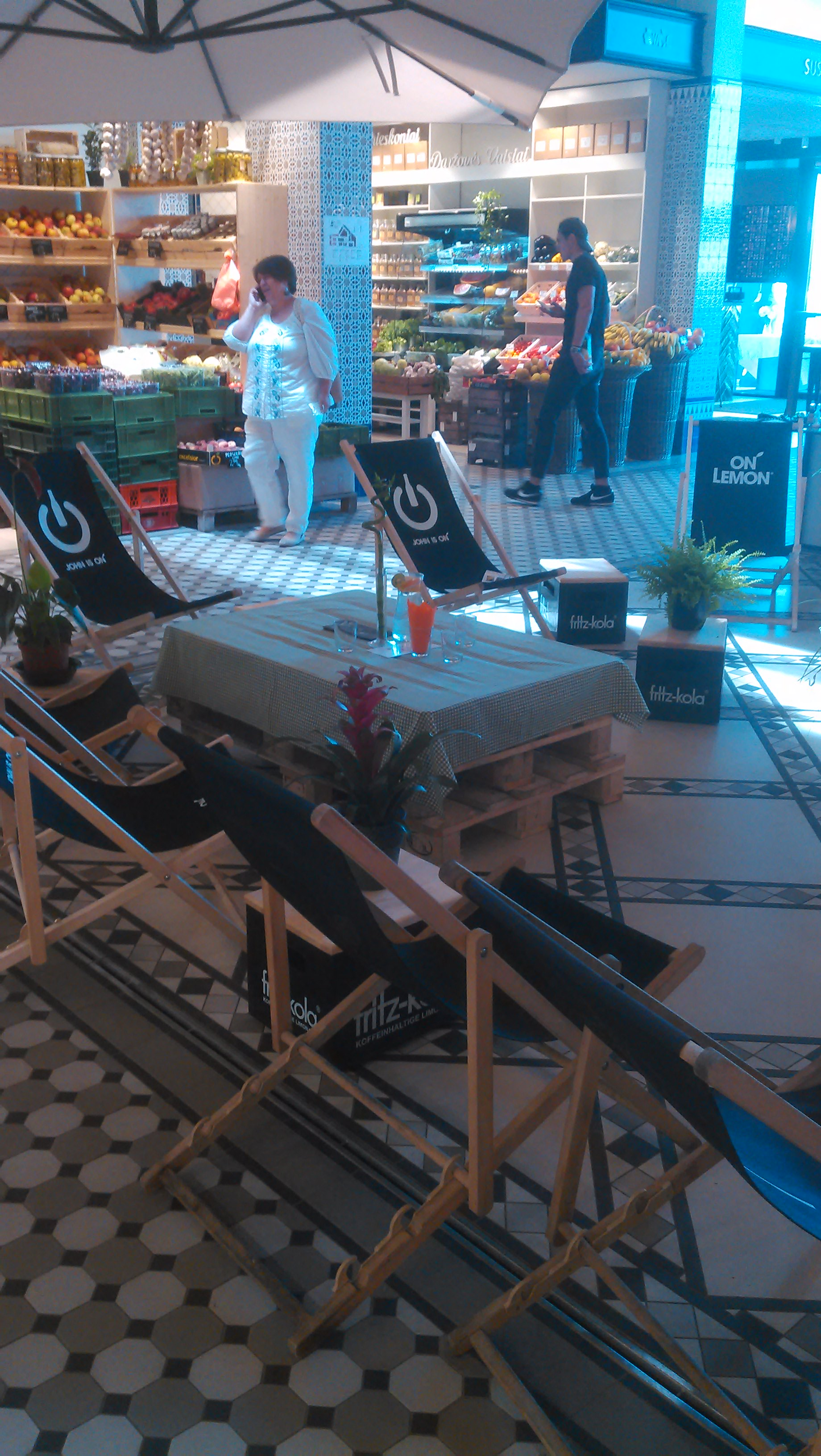
Modern food market Benediktas in Vilnius

Currently, Lithuania is affected by modern cuisine trends—fusion, new Nordic, craft beer, and craft food. Restaurant culture and fine dining is most advanced in bigger cities—Vilnius, Kaunas, and Klaipėda. Every year, the 30 best Lithuanian restaurants are selected by Gero maisto akademija ("Good Food Academy").

== See also ==
- Estonian cuisine
- Finnish cuisine
- Latvian cuisine
- Polish cuisine
- Ukrainian cuisine
