= Spettekaka =

Swedish dessert

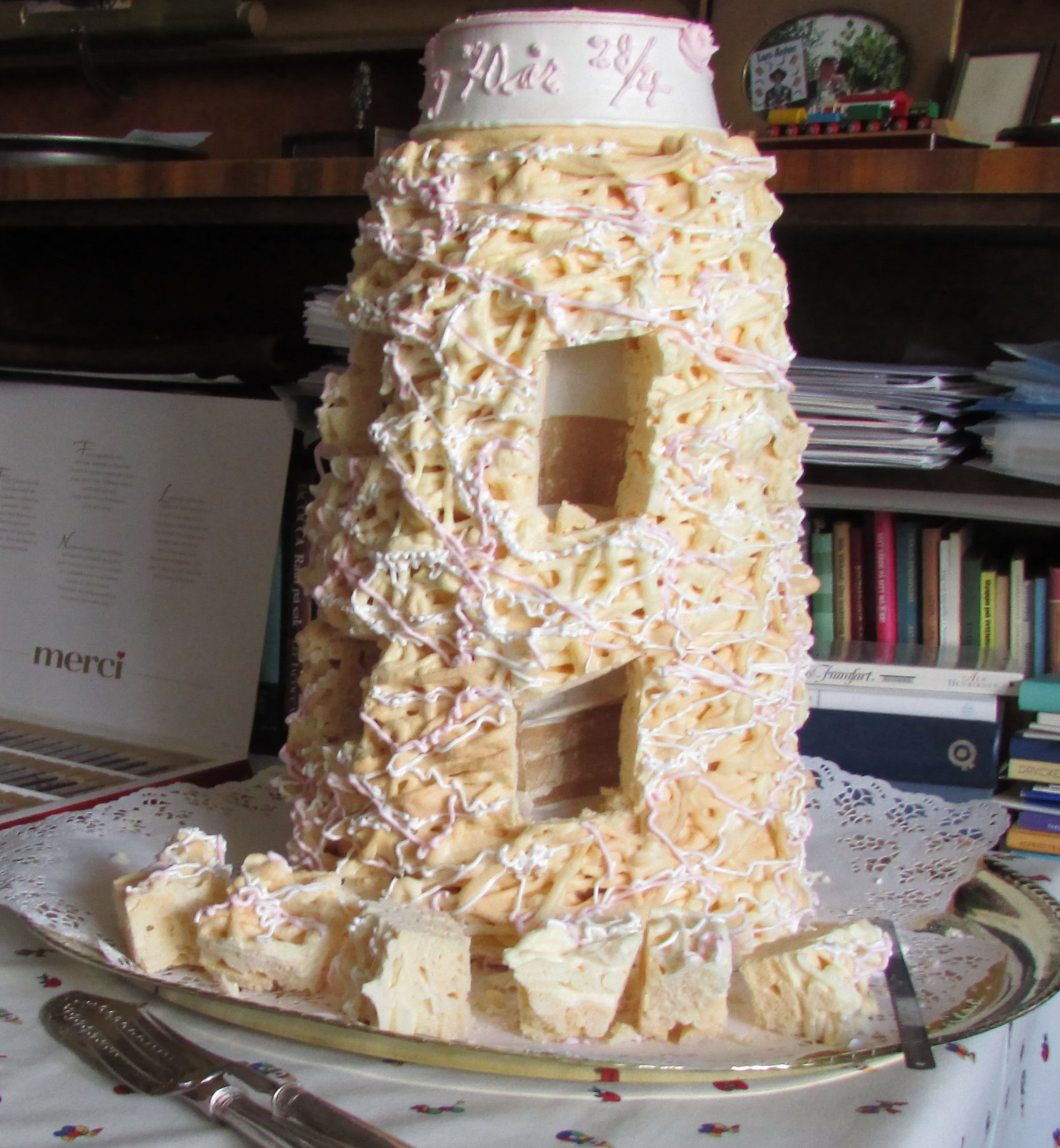
- Type: Spit cake
- Place of origin: Sweden
- Region or state: Scania and Halland
- Main ingredients: Eggs, potato starch flour, sugar

Spettekaka, or spettkaka (spiddekaga in native Scanian), is a local dessert of the southern parts of Sweden, chiefly in the province of Scania (Skåne) but also in Halland. It is an important part of the Scanian culinary heritage. The name means "spit cake", describing the method of preparation.

== Description ==
A mixture consisting mainly of eggs, potato starch flour and sugar is rolled slowly onto a skewer which is being rotated over an open fire or other heat source. The dessert thus produced is very dry (similar to meringue). It is then wrapped in a subsequently sealed plastic bag to preserve its dryness. To stay crisp, the cake should only be unwrapped at the actual moment it is to be eaten.

Spettekaka can range in size anywhere from a few inches to several feet in height and over a foot in diameter. The very large cakes are served by sawing cuboids from the cake, leaving as much standing as possible.

Spettekaka is frequently served accompanied by dark coffee, vanilla ice cream and port wine. A hacksaw blade is used to gently saw the dessert into serving-sized pieces, as it will crumble or shatter if a knife is used or too much pressure is applied with the saw blade.

The world's largest spettekaka was baked in Sjöbo, Scania, in 1985, and is mentioned in the 1986 Guinness Book of Records. It was 3.6 m (12 ft) high and baked in one piece.

Skånsk spettkaka has PGI status under EU law.

== Other regional varieties ==
- Baumkuchen – Germany
- Šakotis – Lithuania
- Kürtőskalács – Hungary
- Trdelník – Czech Republic and Slovakia, also with a PGI status
- Sękacz – Poland

== See also ==
- List of desserts
- List of spit-roasted foods
