= List of spit-roasted foods =

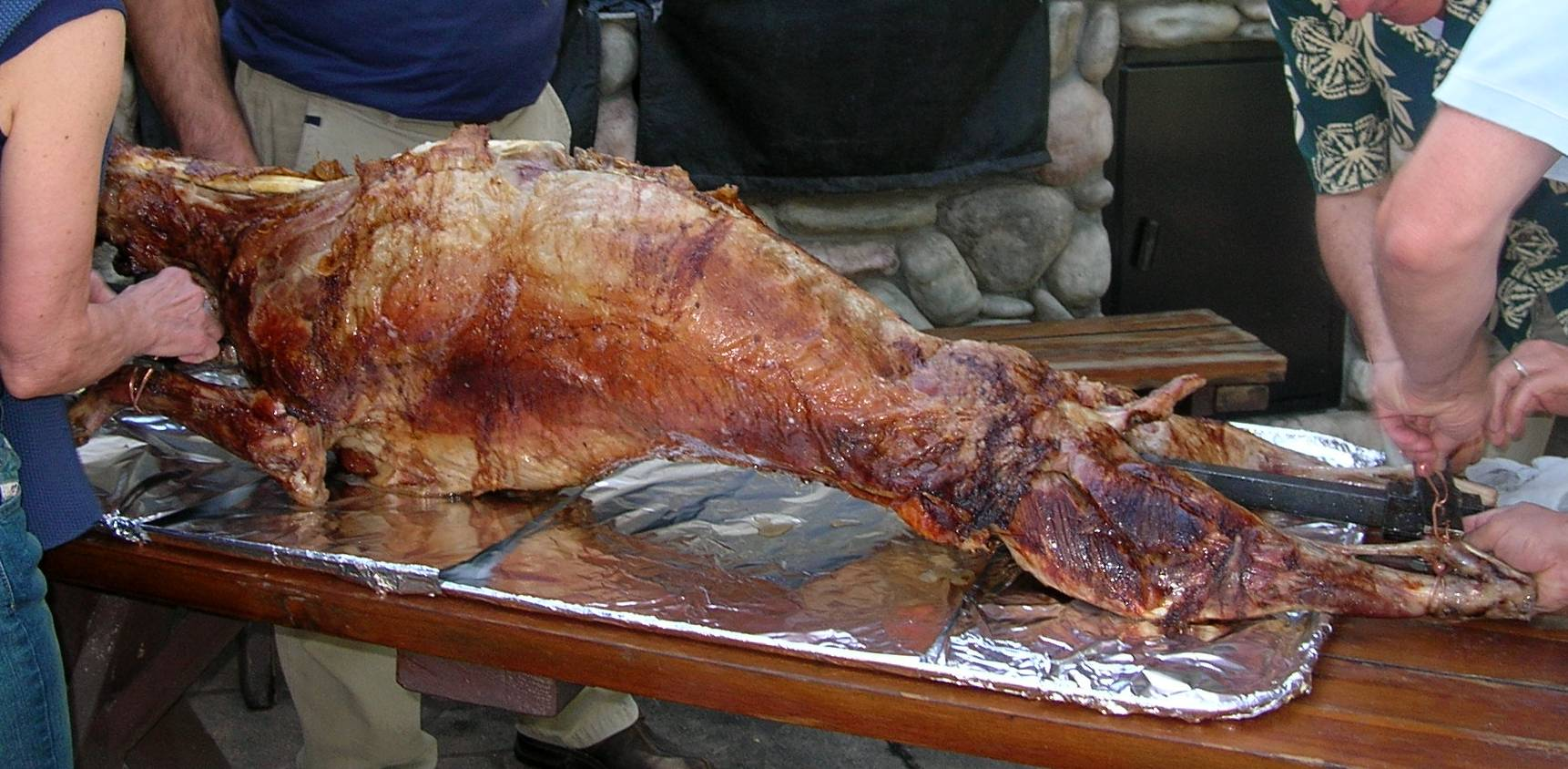
Preparation of méchoui on a spit, which consists of using a whole lamb

This is a list of notable spit-roasted foods, consisting of dishes and foods that are roasted on a rotisserie, or spit. Rotisserie is a style of roasting where meat is skewered on a spit, a long solid rod used to hold food while it is being cooked over a fire in a fireplace or over a campfire, or roasted in an oven. Spit-roasting typically involves the use of indirect heat, which usually cooks foods at a lower temperature compared to other roasting methods that use direct heat. When cooking meats, the nature of the food constantly revolving on a spit also creates a self-basting process. Spit roasting dates back to ancient times, and spit-roasted fowl and game "was common in ancient societies".

== Spit-roasted foods ==
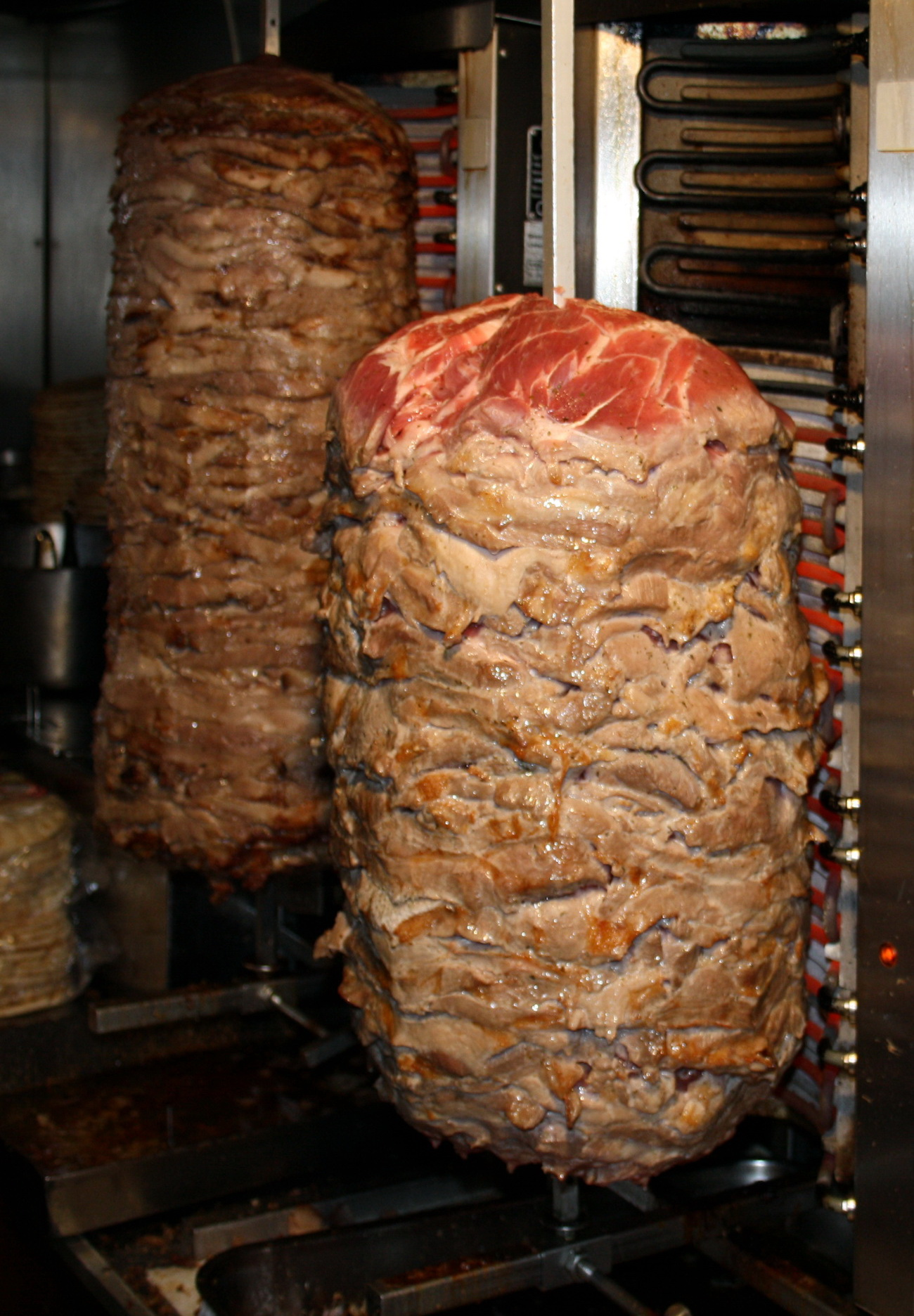
Doner kebab on a vertical spit

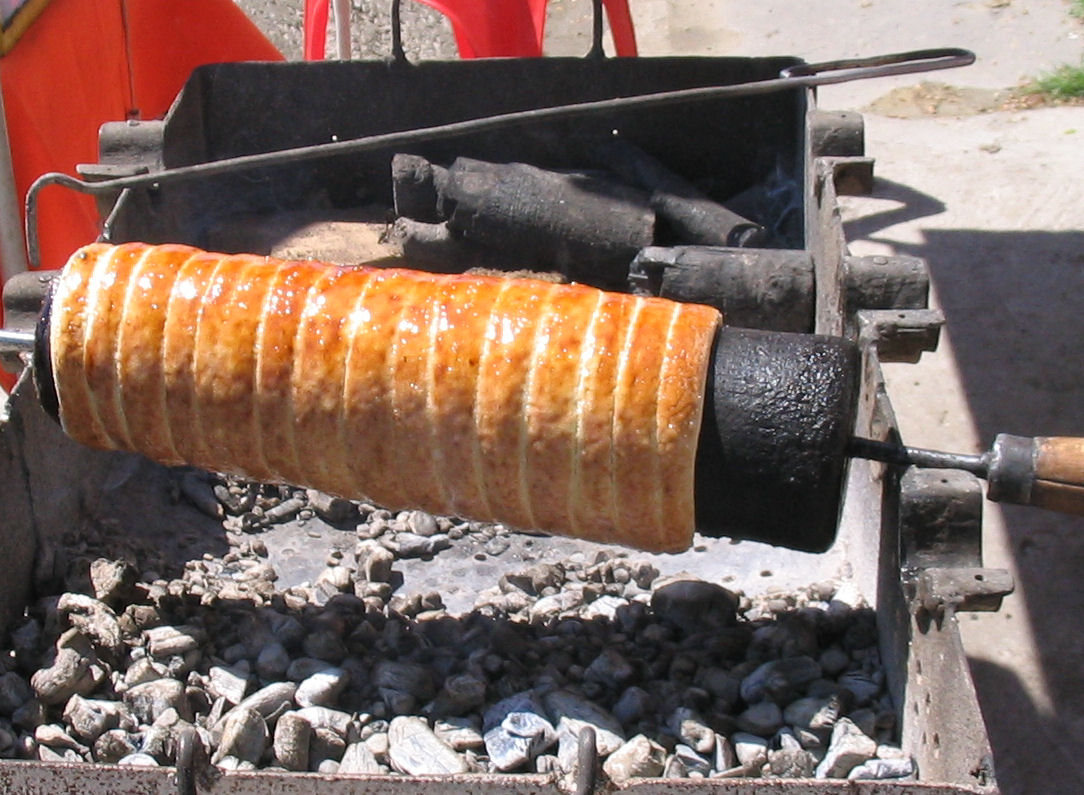
A kürtőskalács spit cake cooking on a spit roast

- Al pastor – a dish developed in central Mexico that is based on shawarma spit-grilled meat brought by Lebanese immigrants to Mexico.
- Cabrito al pastor – a northern Mexican dish consisting of a whole goat kid carcass that is opened flat and cooked on a spit
- Cağ kebabı – a horizontally stacked marinated rotating lamb kebab variety, originating in Turkey's Erzurum Province
- Doner kebab – seasoned meat stacked in the shape of an inverted cone is turned slowly on a rotisserie, next to a vertical cooking element. The outer layer is sliced into thin shavings as it cooks.
- Gyros – a Greek dish made from meat cooked on a vertical rotisserie
- Inihaw – a general Filipino term for grilled or spit-roasted meat or seafood
- Lechon – a general Spanish term for whole spit-roasted pig common in Spain, Latin America, and the Philippines
- Lechon manok – a Filipino spit-roasted chicken dish made with chicken marinated in a mixture of garlic, bay leaf, onion, black pepper, soy sauce, and patis (fish sauce).
- Méchoui – a dish in North African cuisine consisting of a whole sheep or a lamb spit-roasted on a barbecue.
- Mutzbraten – an eastern Thuringia and western Saxony dish of meat from the shoulder or pig`s back, seasoned with salt, pepper and marjoram, marinated and cooked in birch wood smoke on so-called Mutzbraten stands.
- Obersteiner Spießbraten – a culinary specialty of Idar-Oberstein, Germany consisting of a rolled roast using beef or pork neck.
- Paksiw na lechon – a Filipino dish consisting of leftover spit-roasted pork (lechon) meat cooked in lechon sauce or its component ingredients of vinegar, garlic, onions, black pepper and ground liver or liver spread and some water.
- Rotisserie chicken – a chicken dish cooked on a rotisserie, whereby the chicken is placed next to the heat source to cook it

- Pollo a la Brasa – a common dish of Peruvian cuisine and one of the most consumed in Peru, it is a rotisserie chicken dish that is a Peruvian version of pollo al spiedo.

- Shawarma – a Middle Eastern meat preparation based on the doner kebab of Ottoman Turkey
- Siu mei – the generic name in Cantonese cuisine given to meats roasted on spits over an open fire or a huge wood burning rotisserie oven.
- Spettekaka – a local dessert in some southern areas of Sweden, the name means "cake on a spit", which describes its method of preparation.
- Spit cake – a European cake made with layers of dough or batter deposited, one at a time, onto a tapered cylindrical rotating spit

- Baumkuchen – a German variety of spit cake
- Kürtőskalács – a spit cake specific to Hungarian-speaking regions in Romania, more predominantly the Székely Land, and popular in Hungary and Romania
  - Baumstriezel – a similar pastry to Kürtőskalács originating from the Saxon communities of Transylvania
  - Trdelník – a spit cake similar to Kürtőskalács popular in Slovakia and Czechia
- Šakotis – a Polish-Lithuanian traditional spit cake

- Suckling pig – traditionally cooked whole, often roasted, in various cuisines, and sometimes cooked on a rotisserie

== Gallery ==
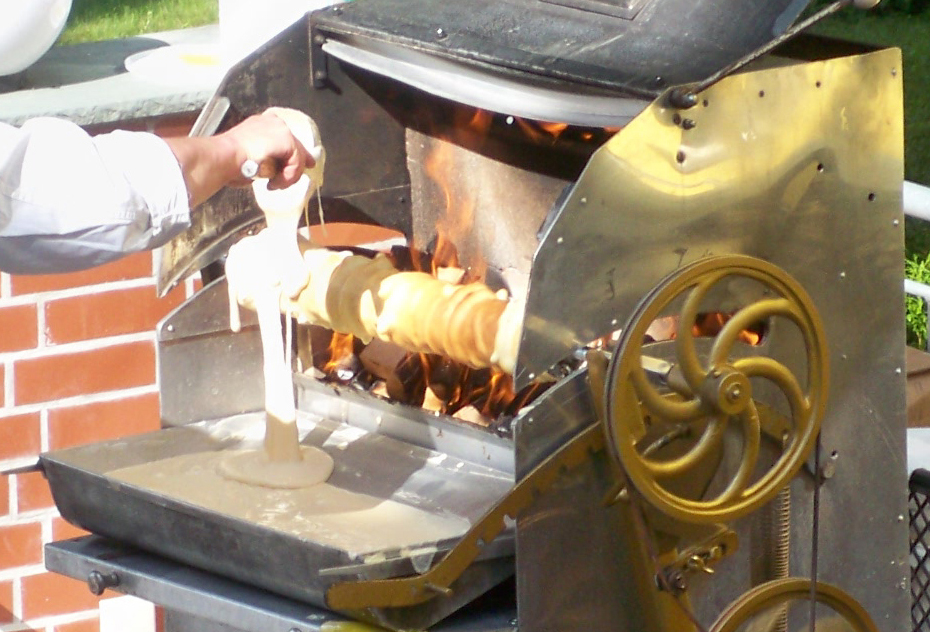
Baumkuchen being prepared on a rotisserie

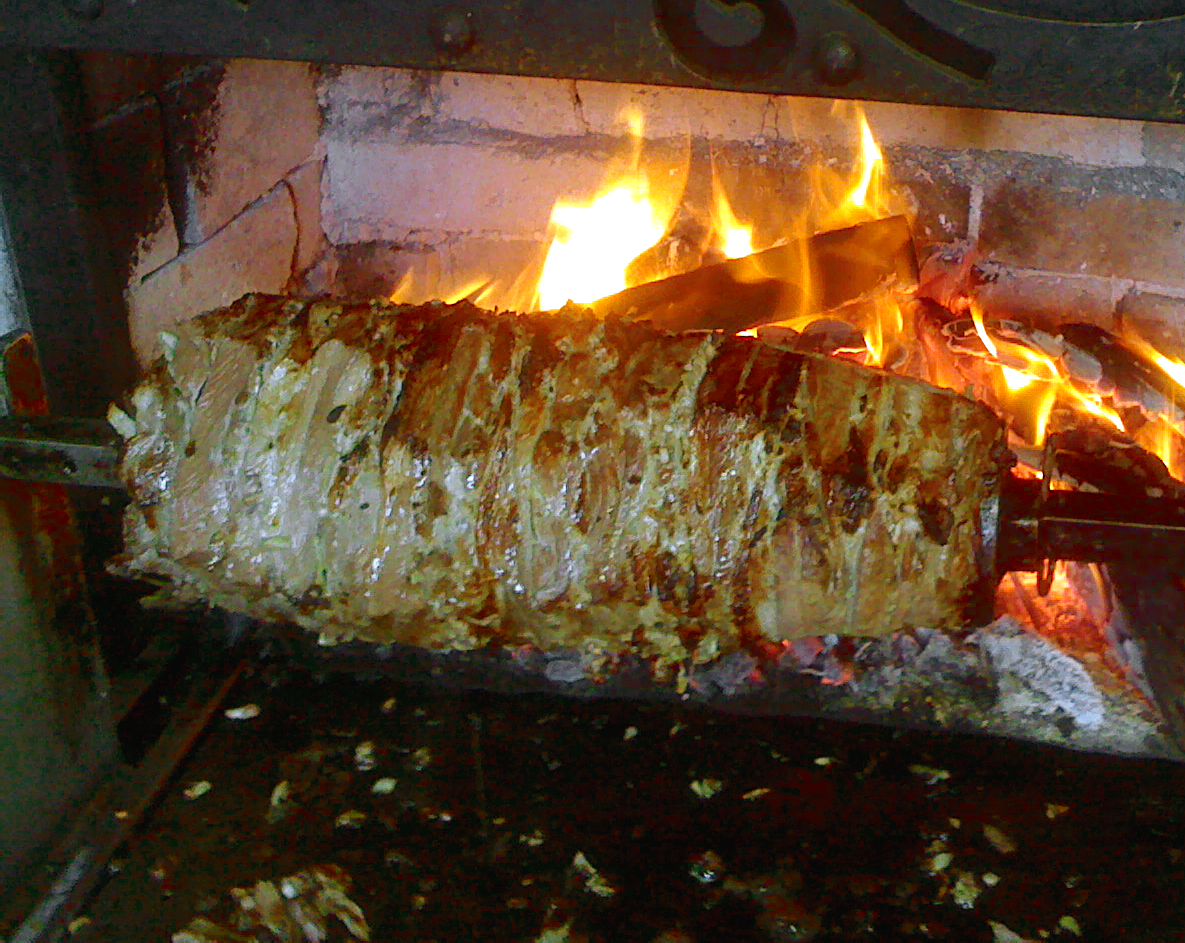
Cağ kebabı

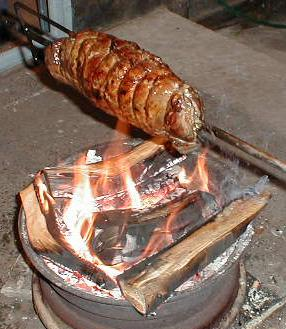
Obersteiner Spießbraten

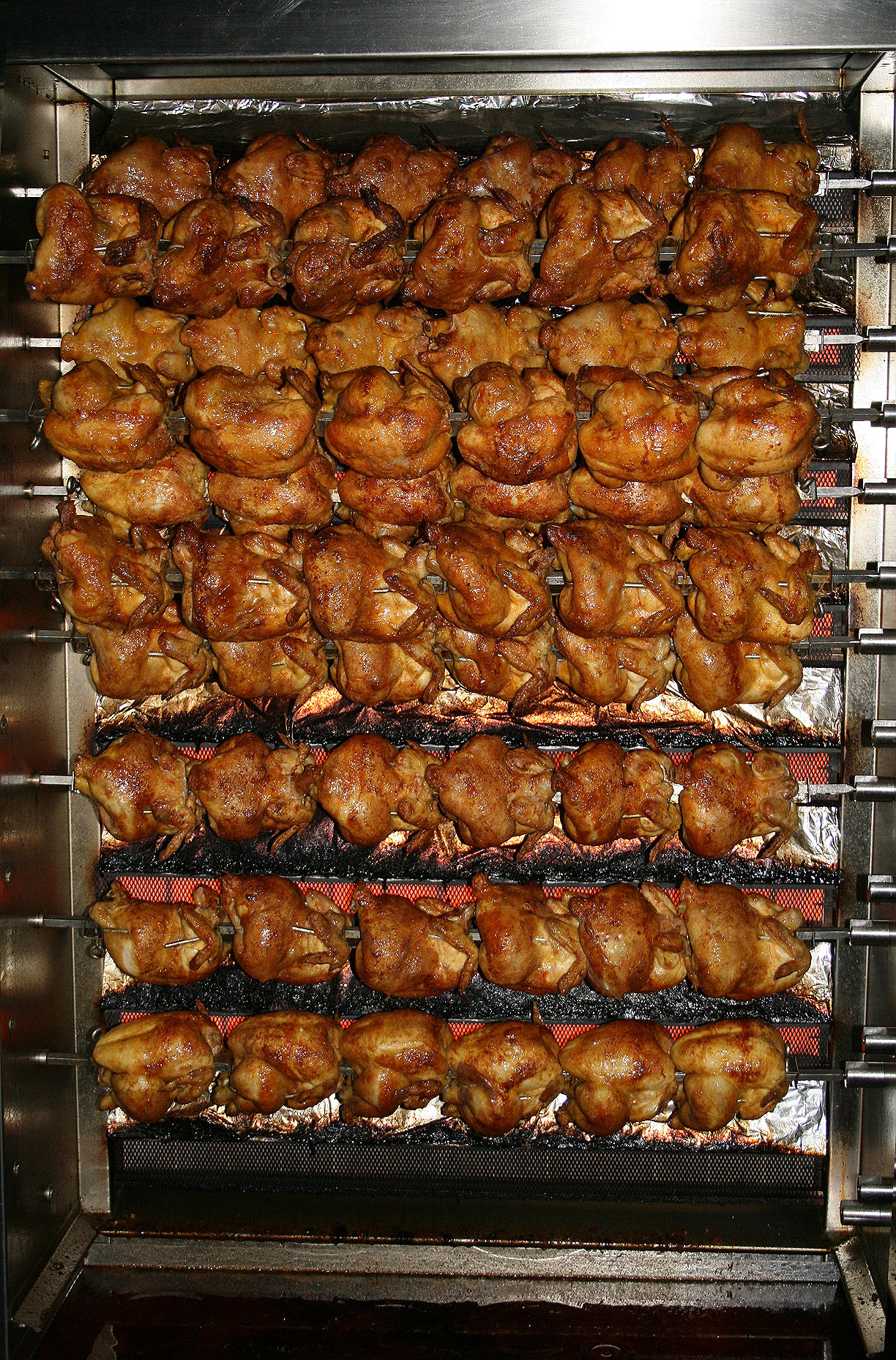
Rotisserie chicken

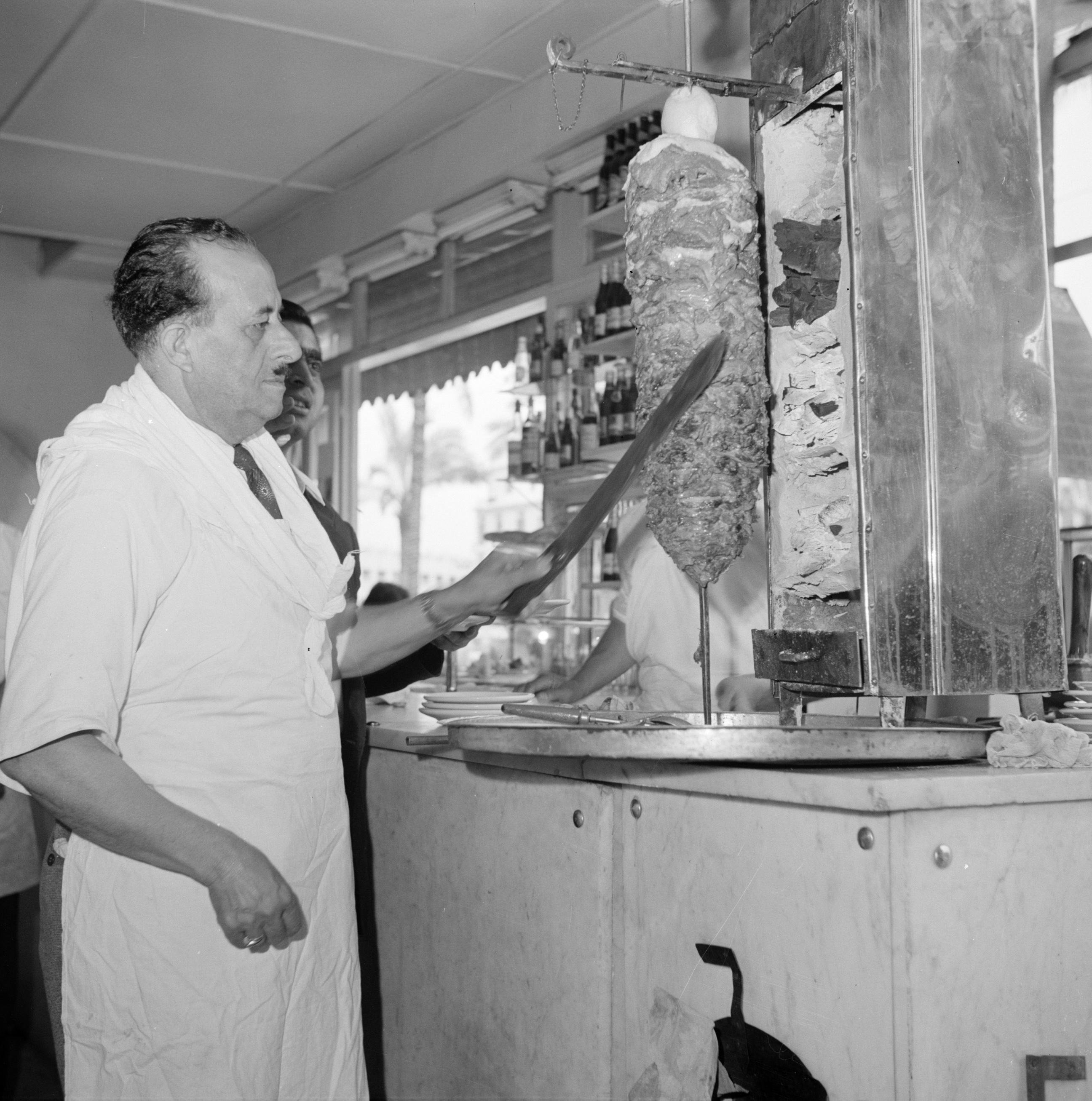
Shawarma in Lebanon, 1950

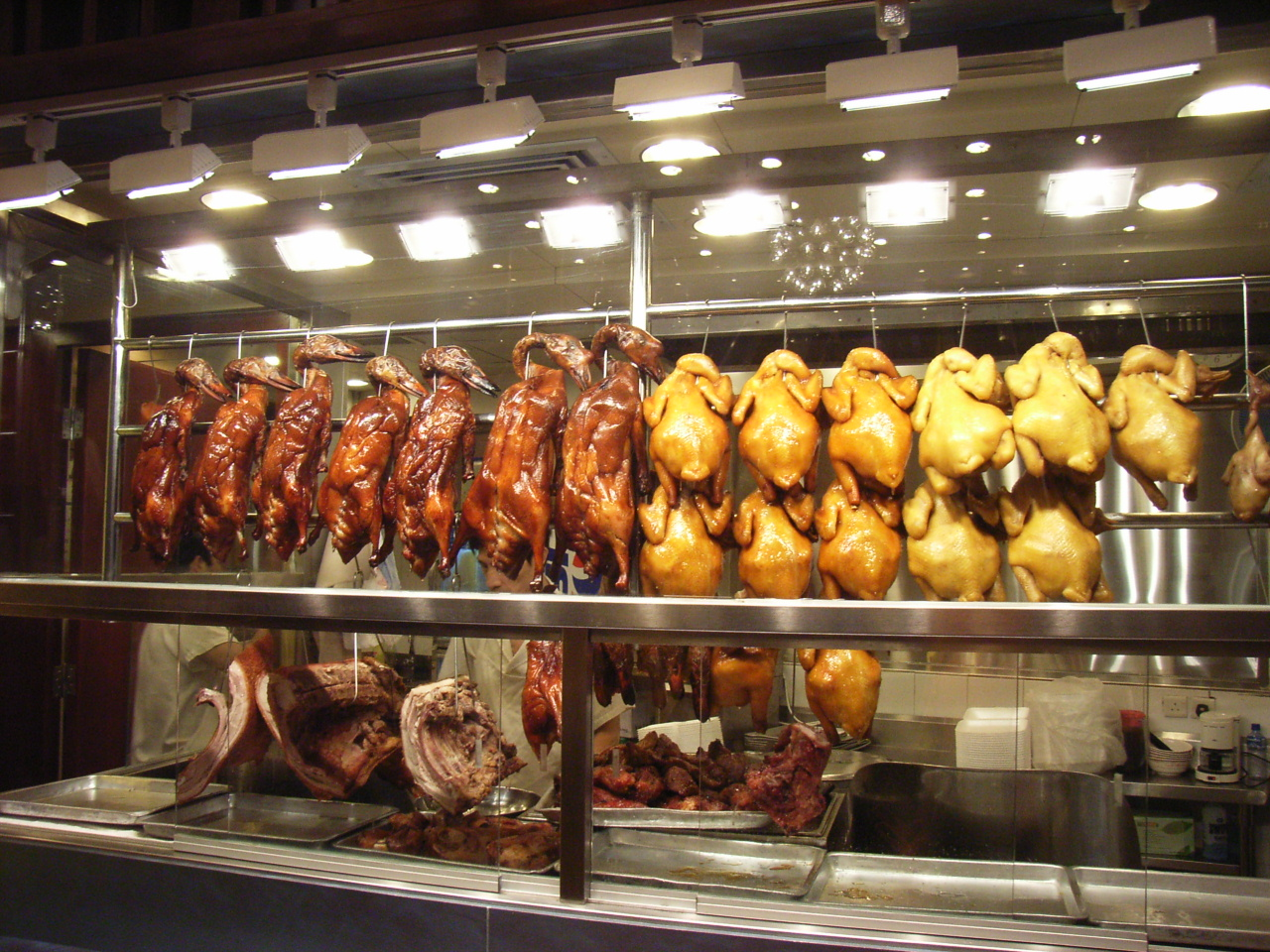
Siu mei – roasted goose (top left), chicken (top right) and pork (bottom)

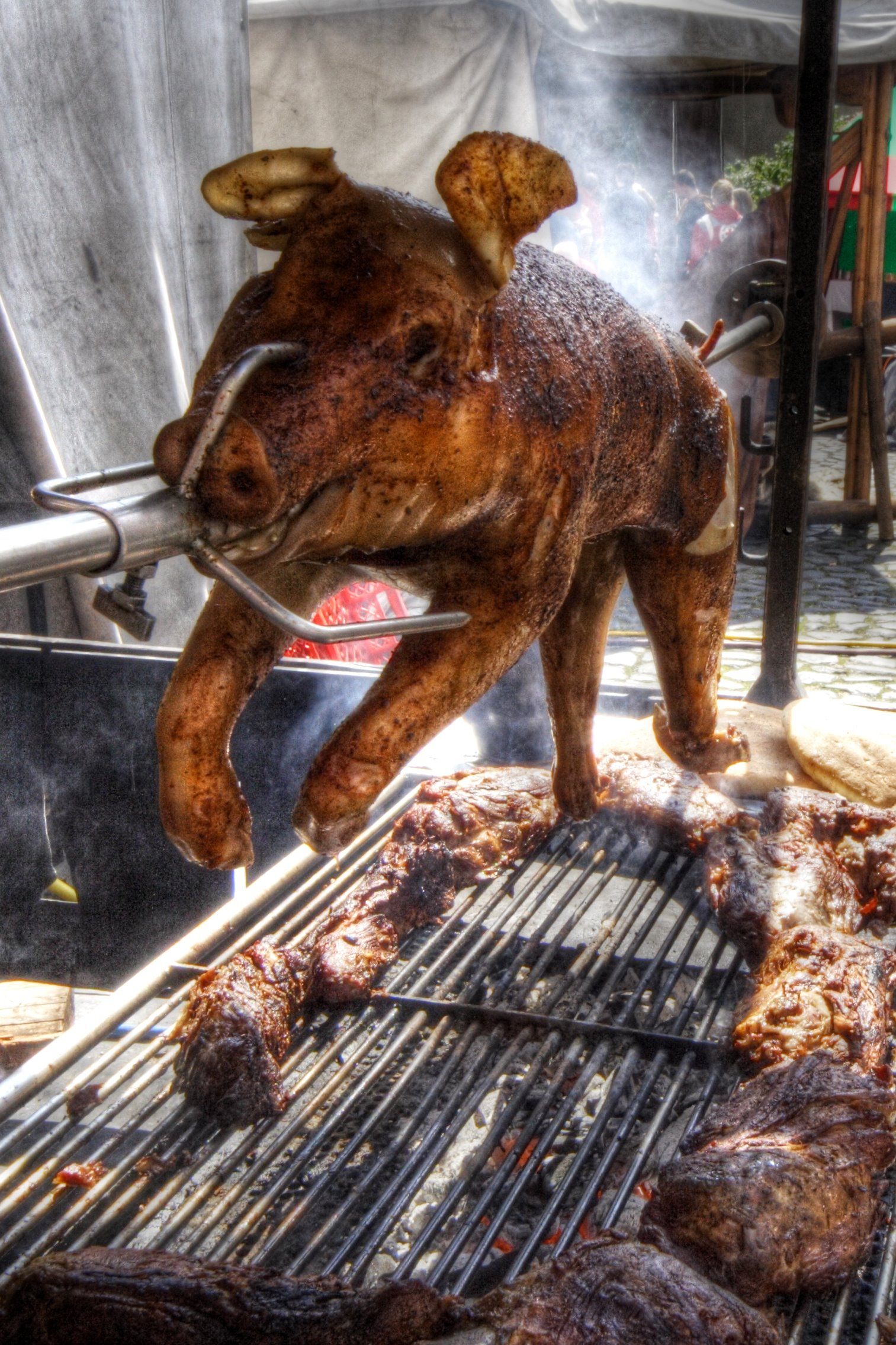
Spanferkel, a spit-roasted suckling pig in German cuisine
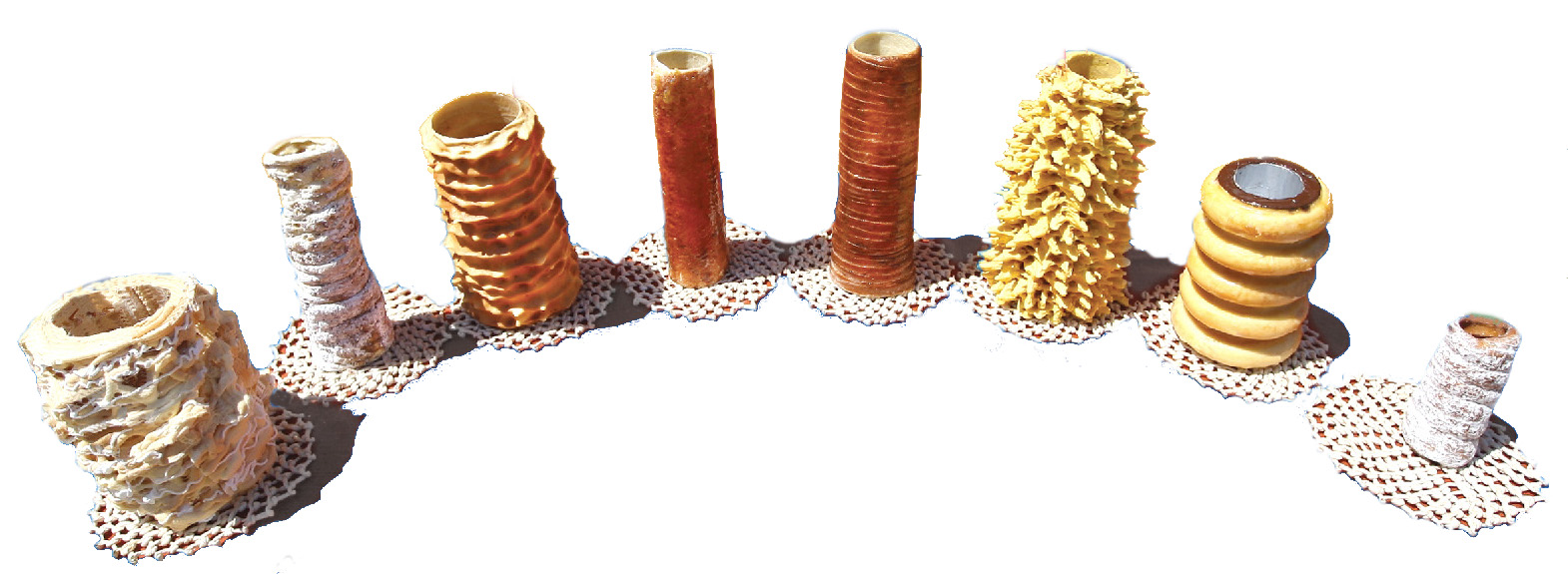
Several national variants of spit cakes

== See also ==
- List of barbecue dishes
- List of cooking techniques
- List of kebabs
- List of meat dishes
- List of smoked foods
- Pig roast
- Category:Skewered foods
