= Šakotis =

Traditional Lithuanian cake

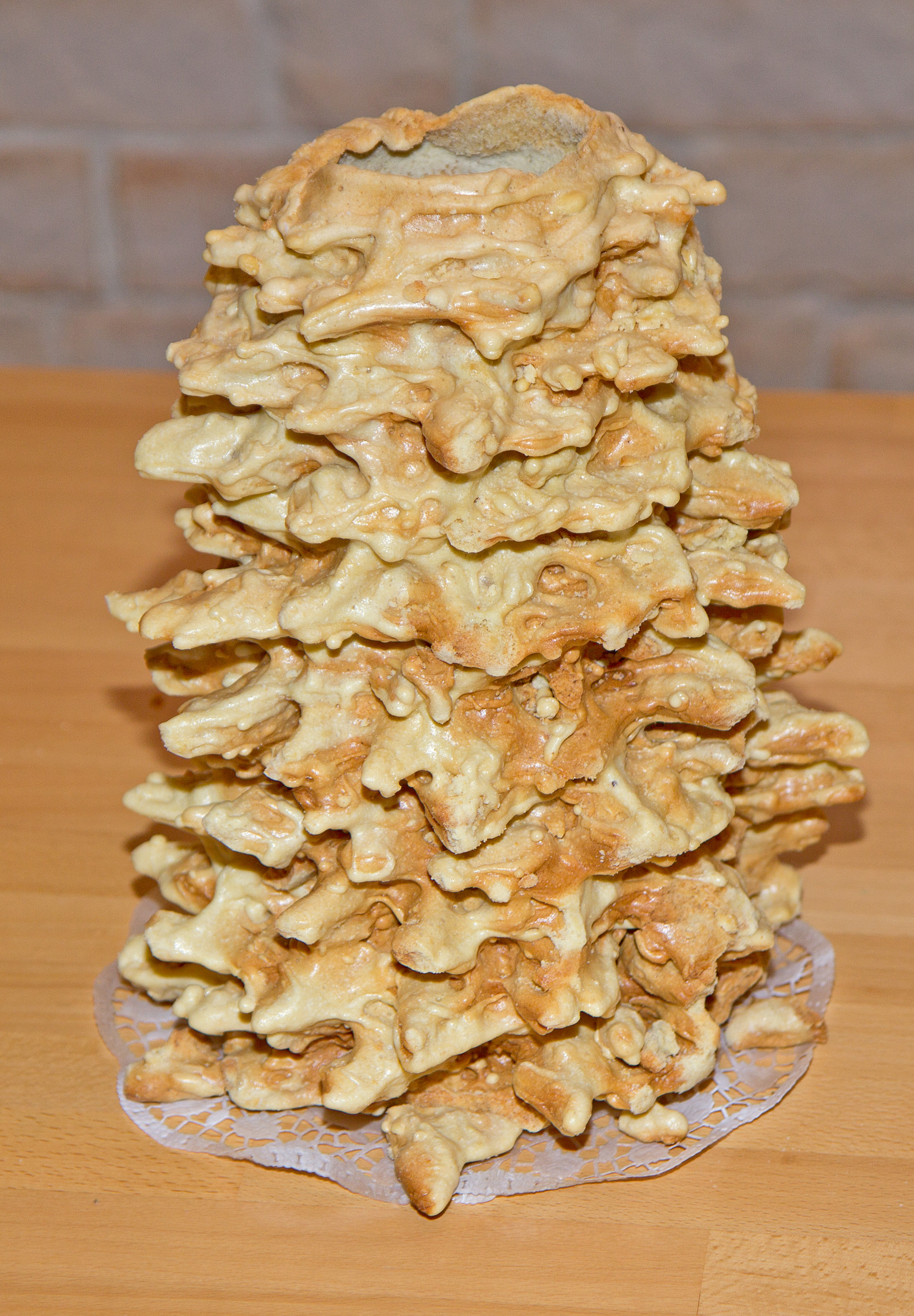
- Lithuanian šakotis
- Alternative names: Sękacz (Poland); Bankukha (Belarus); Raguolis (Lithuania)
- Type: Cake
- Region or state: Lithuania, Poland, Belarus
- Created by: Baumkuchen makers

Šakotis ("tree cake") (Polish: sękacz [ˈsɛŋkat͡ʂ], Belarusian: банкуха, romanized: bankukha) is a spit cake. It is a national Lithuanian, local Polish (northeasternmost part of Poland), and local westernmost Belarusian traditional spit cake, made of butter, egg whites and yolks, flour, sugar, and cream, cooked on a rotating spit in an oven or over an open fire.

== History ==
A woman in Kaunas shows how šakotis is traditionally made.

The cake became popular in the 19th century in the former territory of the Polish–Lithuanian Commonwealth (1569–1791). Its origins are related to the baumkuchen in German cuisine. The first recipe in Lithuania and the whole region was published in Vilnius by Jan Szyttler in 1830 (the culinary book "Kucharz dobrze usposobiony...").

Its name means "tree cake" due to its distinctive shape (it is often conical, like a pine tree, and with the drips as branches) and "tree rings" inside. It is baked in a time- and labor-intensive process, by painting layers of batter onto a rotating spit in a special open oven or over an open fire.

It can be decorated with chocolate and flower ornaments, but it is often served plain. Šakotis is one of the most important desserts in Lithuanian celebrations, especially at weddings or other special occasions such as Easter or Christmas. It was the sweet chosen to represent Lithuania in the Café Europe initiative of the Austrian presidency of the European Union, on Europe Day 2006.

In May 2015, in Druskininkai, Lithuania, the record of the biggest šakotis was broken with 372 centimetres (12.20 ft) height and 85.8 kilograms (189 lb) weight.

In 2006, Masurian sękacz was included in the list of traditional products of the Warmian–Masurian Voivodeship in Poland.

In 2019, the bankukha recipe from Porazava was included in the official list of the historical and cultural heritage of Belarus. In north-western Belarus, bankukha is known as a wedding cake made of 60 egg yolks.

== Other regional varieties ==
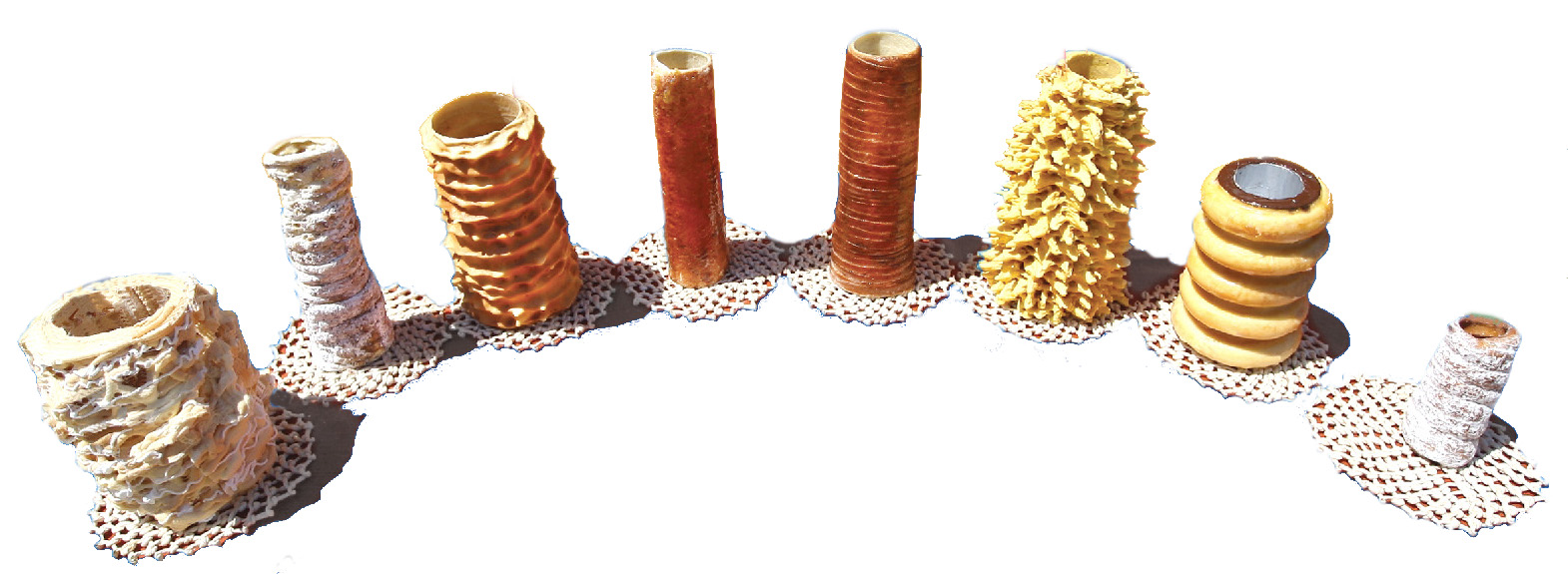
The family of European spitcakes

- Austria – Prügelkrapfen
- Belarus – bankukha (corrupted German word Baumkuchen meaning "Tree cake")
- Czech Republic – Trdelník
- France – Gâteau à la broche
- Germany - Baumkuchen
- Luxembourg – Baamkuch has become a traditional dish served mostly on special occasions, such as weddings, christenings, etc. Yet, the cake is available all year around in certain supermarkets.
- Poland – Sękacz
- Sweden – Spettekaka with the protected geographical indication (PGI) registered by the EU
- Hungary – Kürtőskalács is a similar cake also cooked on a spit
- Slovakia – Skalický trdelník with the protected geographical indication (PGI) registered by the EU
- Turkey – Makara tatlısı is a similar cake also cooked on a spit.

== Gallery ==
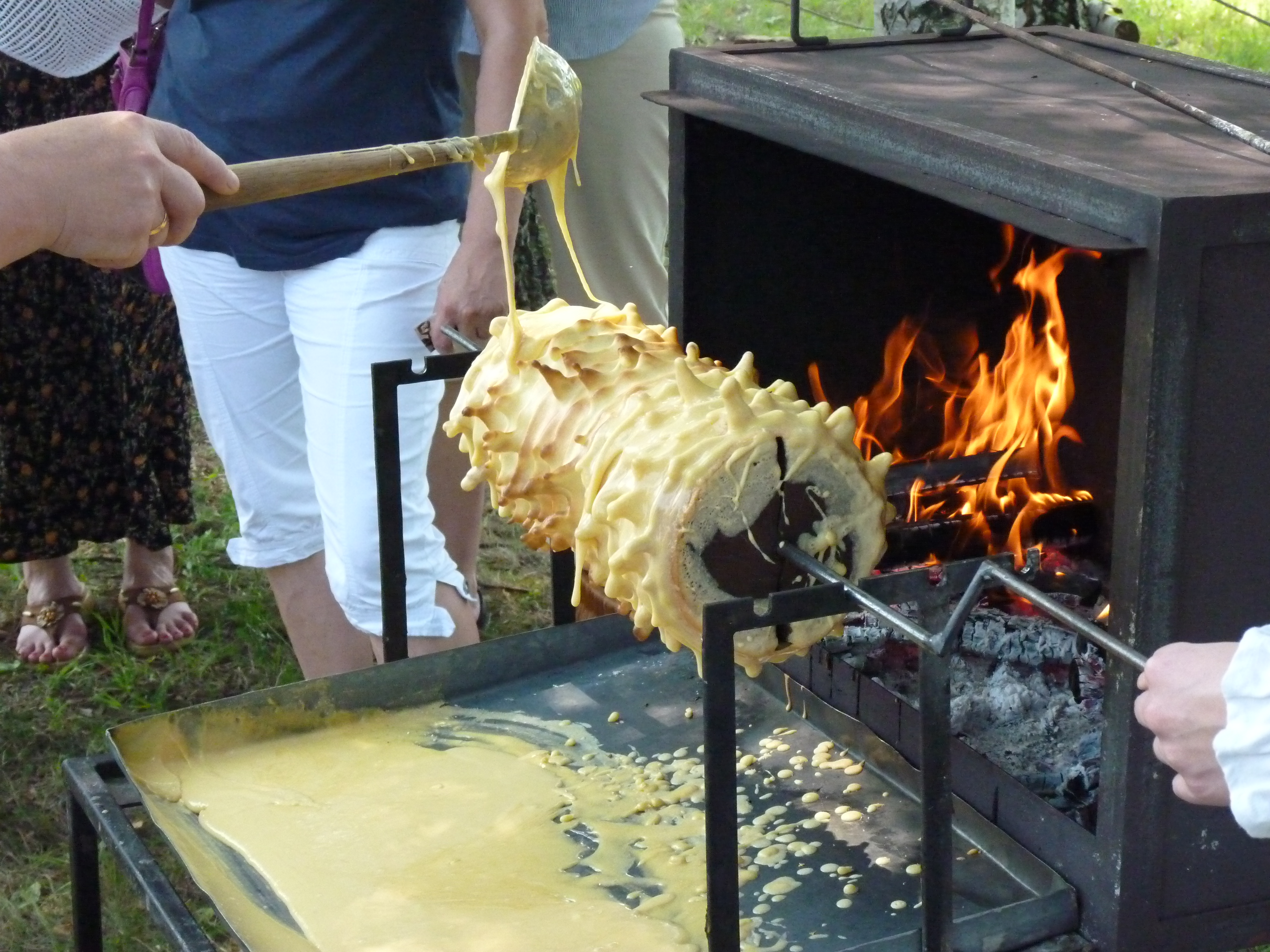
Preparation of Sękacz in Podlaskie Voivodeship, Poland

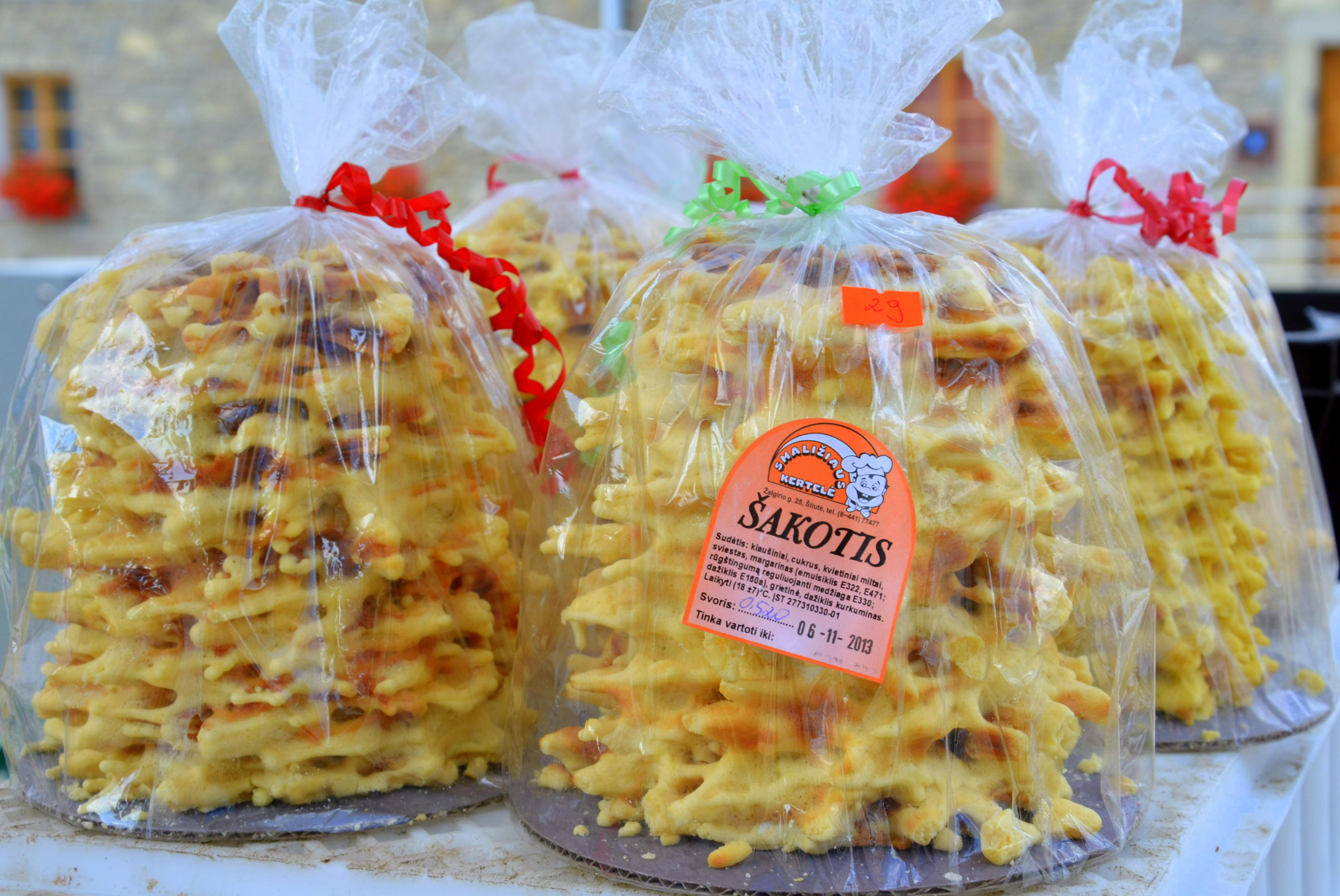
Plain, low types of soft Šakotis

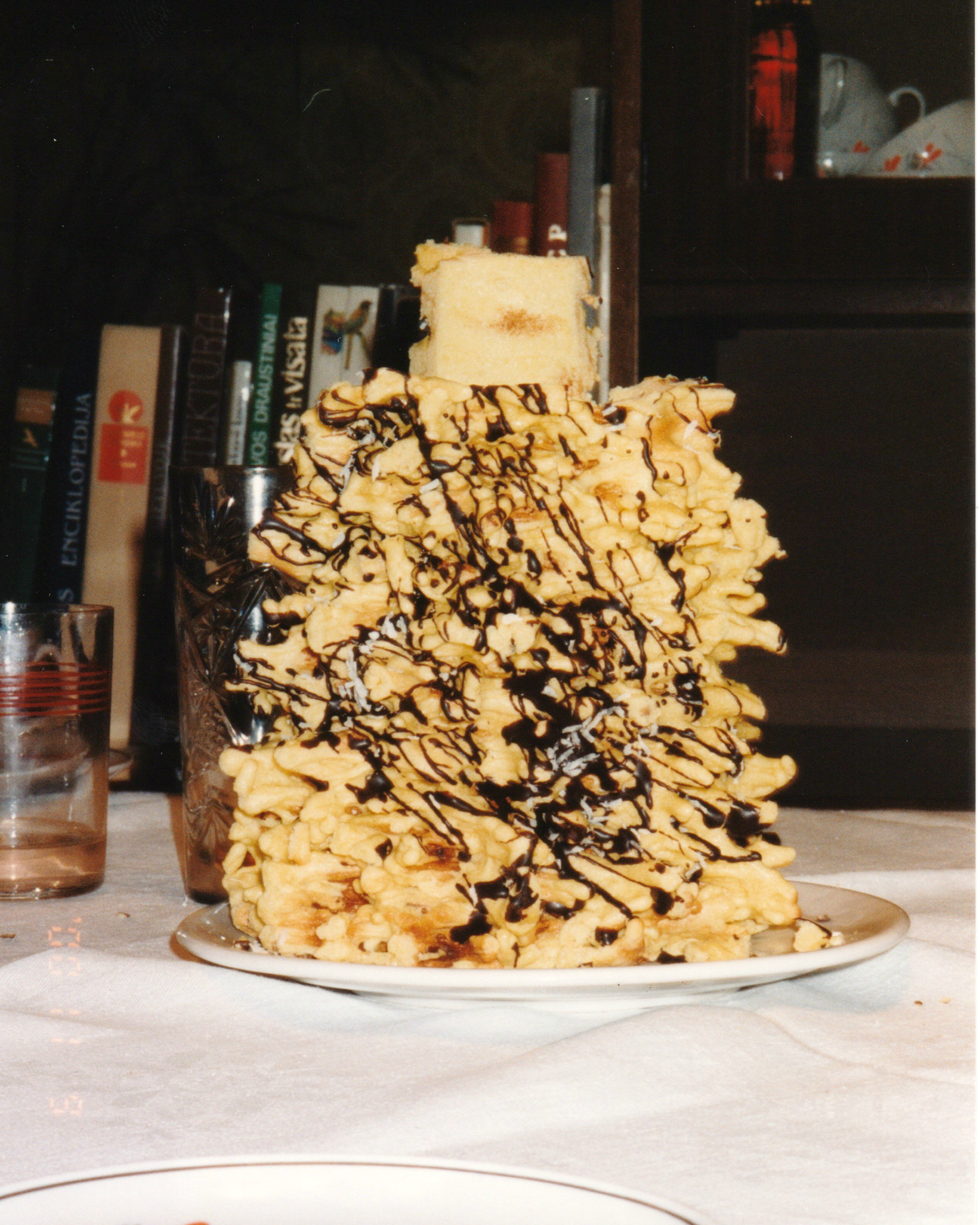
Šakotis decorated with chocolate chips and coconut shavings

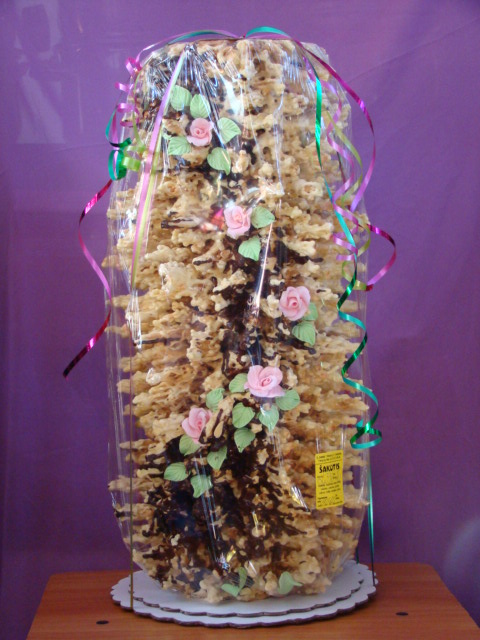
Tall Šakotis, decorated with flowers

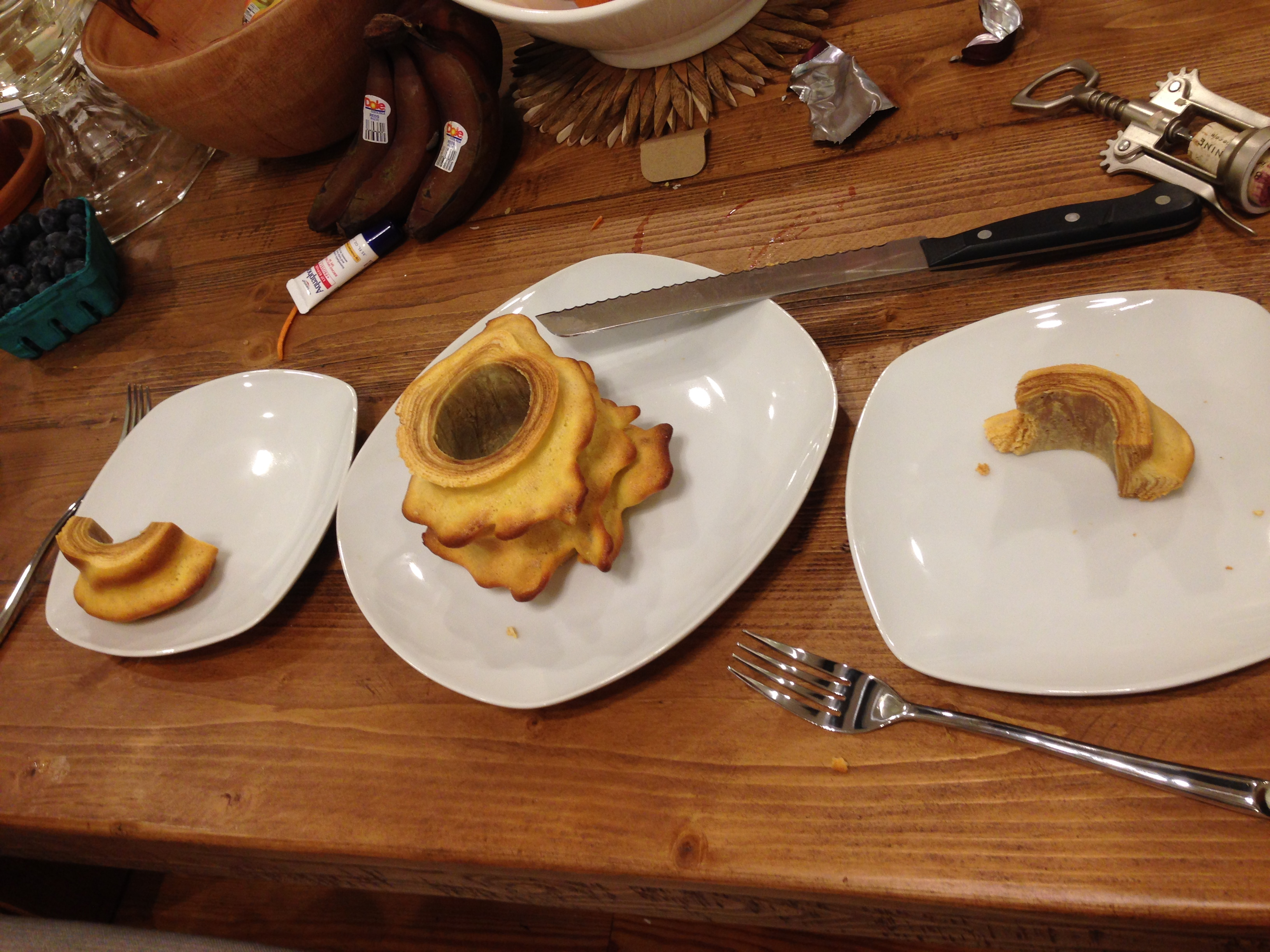
The cake (center) served onto plates (right and left) showing characteristic cake layers resembling growth rings of trees

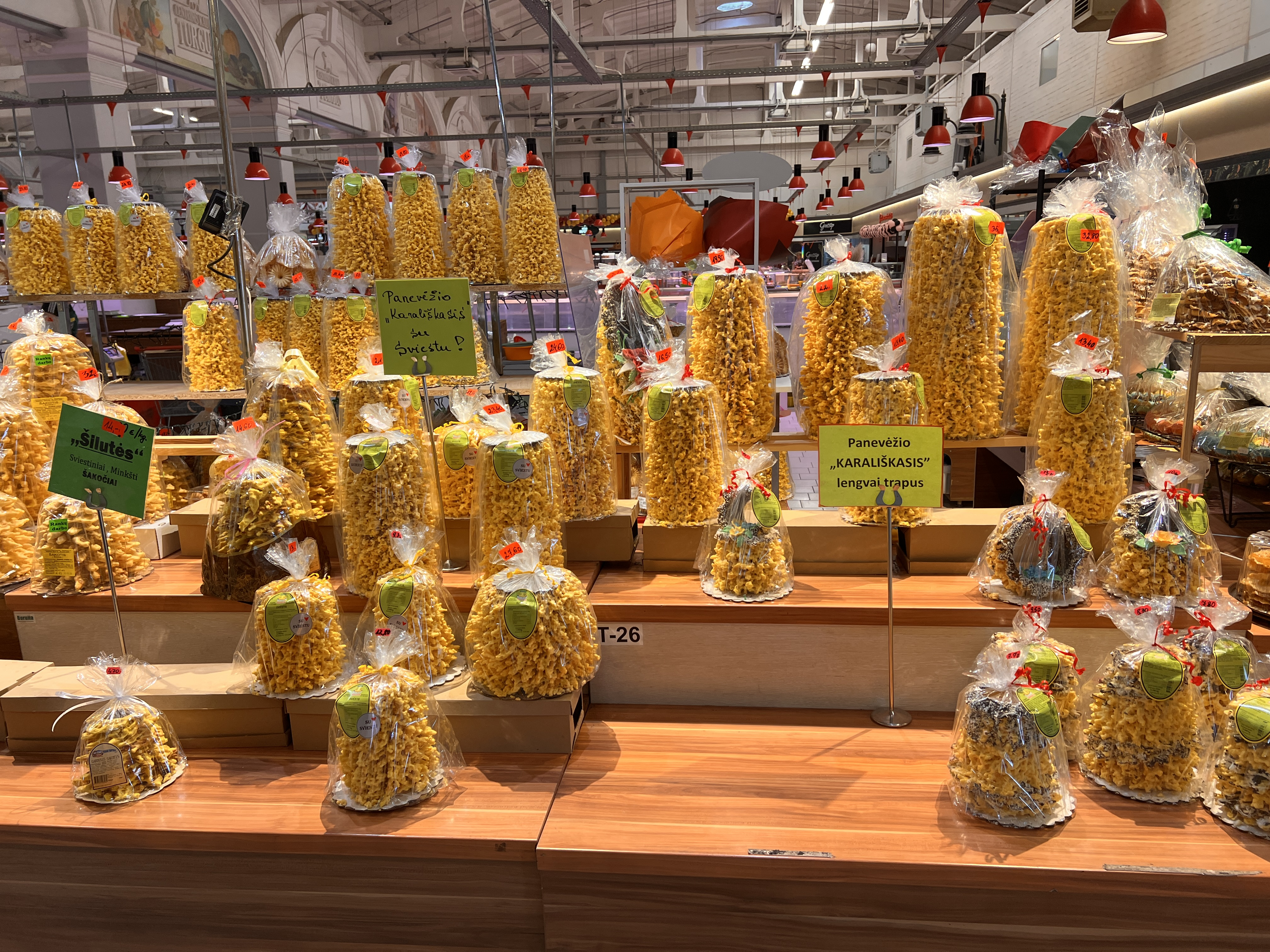
Display of Šakotis cakes in the Kaunas Central Market at URMAS.

== See also ==
- Lithuanian cuisine
- Podlaskie cuisine
- List of desserts
- List of Polish desserts
- List of spit-roasted foods
