= Spit cake =

European-style cake roasted on a rotating spit

External videos
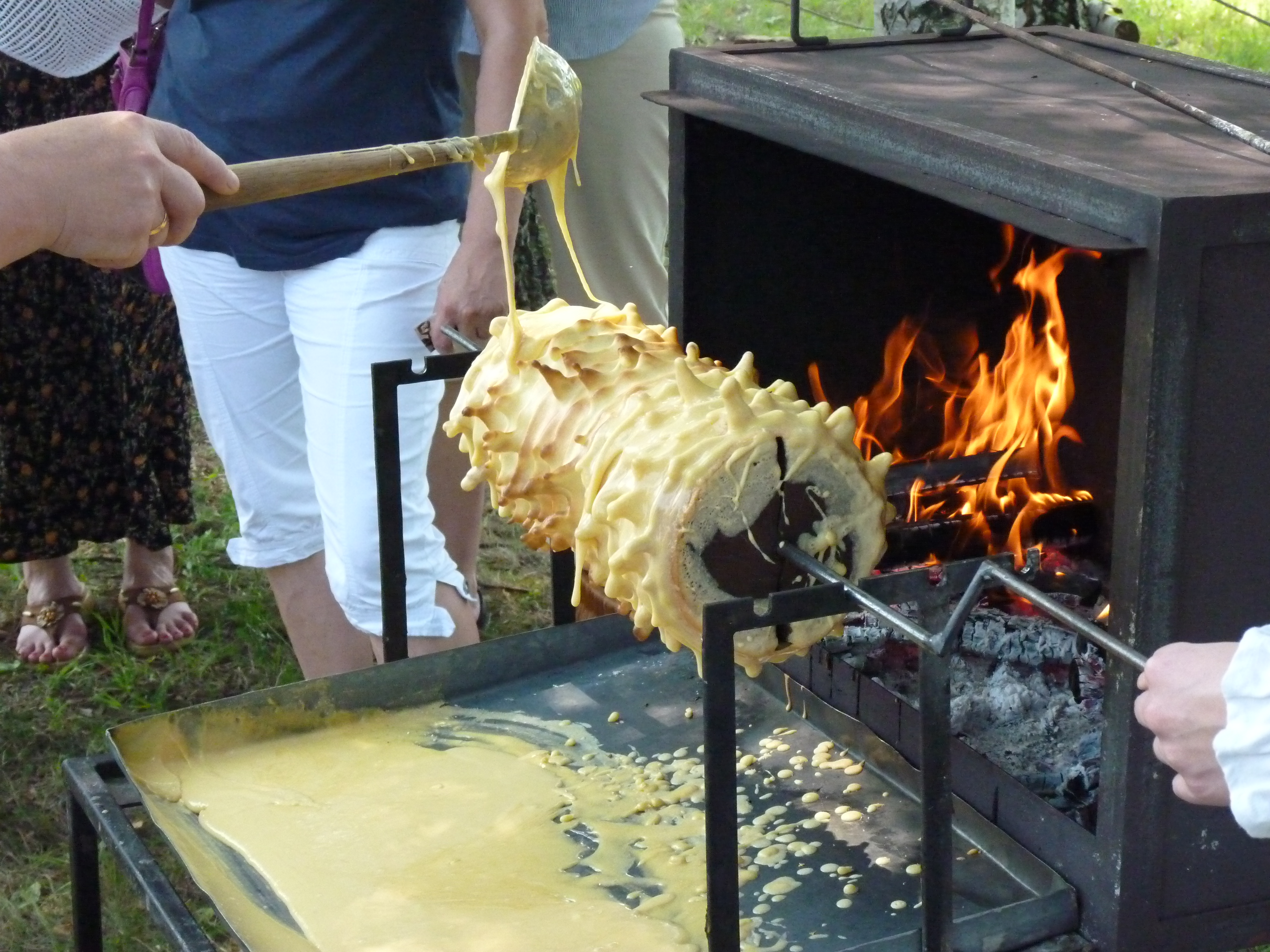
- Original Salzwedeler Baumkuchen
- Kürtőskalács making, short video

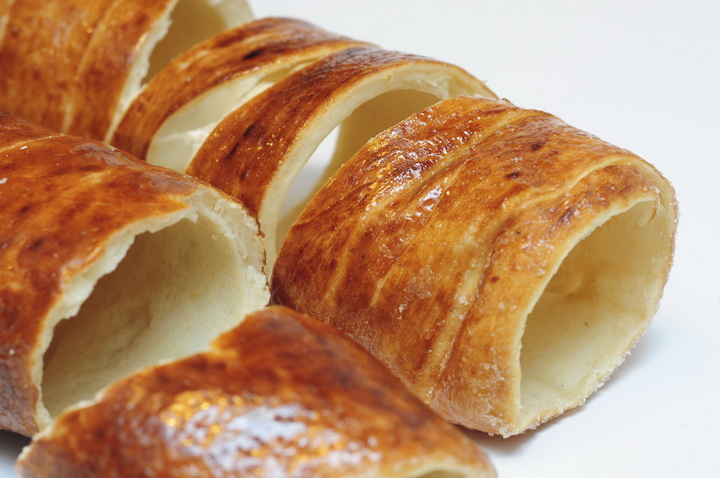
Kürtőskalács has a spiral form.

A spit cake is a European-styled cake made with layers of dough or batter deposited, one at a time, onto a tapered cylindrical rotating spit. The dough is baked by an open fire or a special oven, rotisserie-style. Generally, spit cakes are associated with celebrations such as weddings and Christmas. The spit can be dipped in a thin dough, or the dough can be poured or rolled on the spit.

This cake group may have originated in the classical era, around 400 BC, when similar large cakes were prepared on spits for Dionysiac feasts. In the Deipnosophistae, the Ancient Greek writer Athenaeus (c. 170 – c. 230) describes some of the bread, cakes, and pastries available in classical times. Among the breads mentioned are griddle cakes, honey-and-oil bread, mushroom-shaped loaves covered in poppy seeds, and the military specialty of rolls baked on a spit.

== Preparation techniques ==
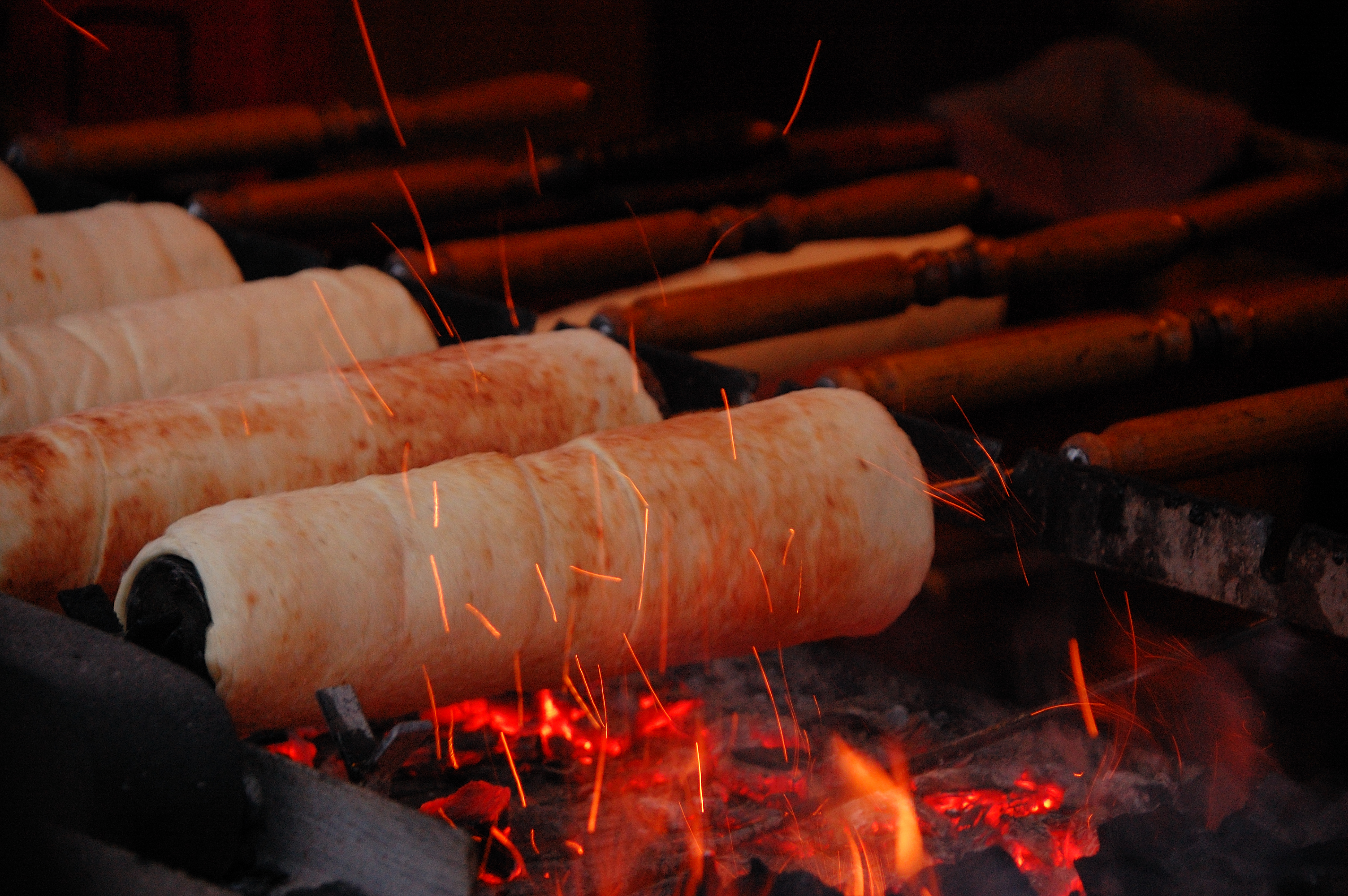
The traditional way of cooking some spit cakes, using charcoal

The cooking process is similar for all the spit cakes: they all consist of a dough applied on a spit which is slowly rotated over an open fire or other heat source. One way of doing this is when the spit is dipped several times in a bowl with liquid dough or the thin dough is poured on a spit. Depending on the dough's consistency and the spit's speed, it will form a layer on the spit, and when very runny, it will drop, thus producing small spikes, giving the cake a coral-like appearance. The resulting cake consists of many layers of cooked dough, and when cut is shown to consist of rings – hence the German name for this type of cake, Baumkuchen, or "tree cake."

Alternatively, the dough is wrapped around the spit as spiral threads. In some varieties of the cake, while they maintain the shape of the spit cake, the rings are actually baked separately and attached to each other with icing. Some spit cakes have a smooth surface. Others, like spettekaka and šakotis, have an irregular shape.

== Varieties ==
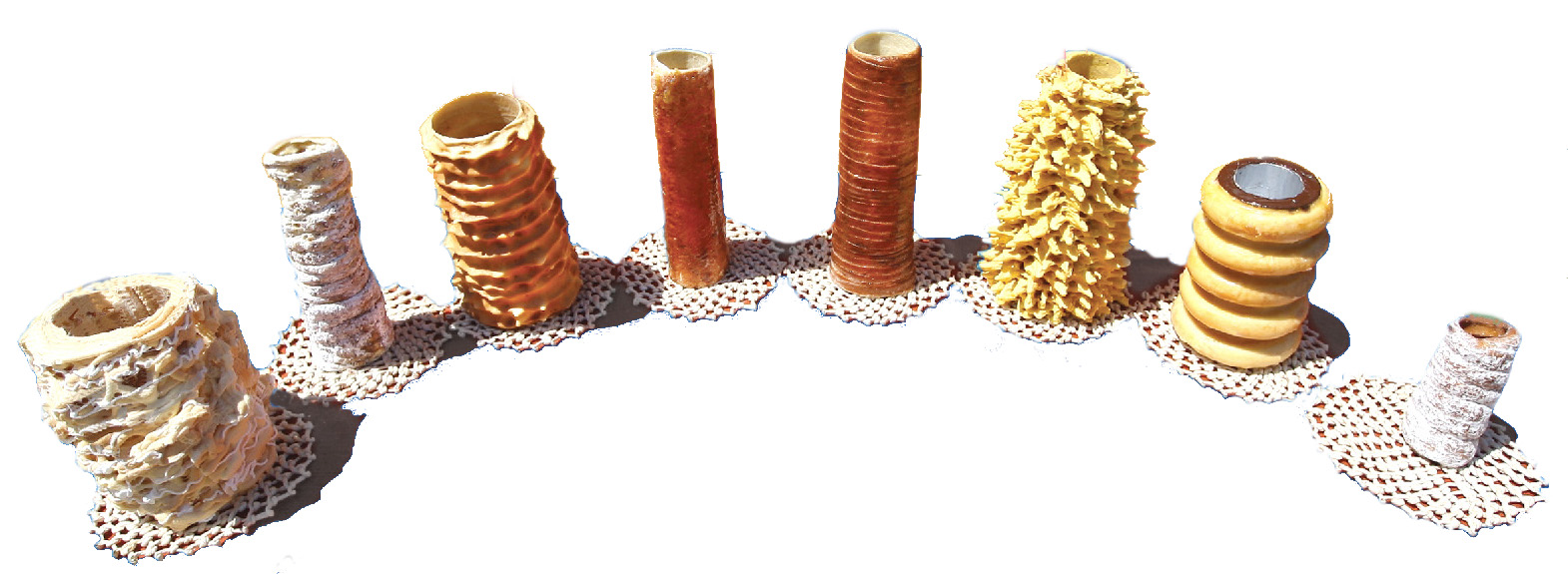
Several national variants of spit cakes: Spettekaka, Trdelník, Prügelkrapfen, Baumstriezel, Kürtőskalács, Šakotis, Baumkuchen, Kürtősfánk

Variations on the basic process are found in many countries and cultures; what they have in common is that the laborious and time-consuming process produces a cake suitable for special occasions, such as weddings or Christmas feasts. Some varieties are made with a dough with flowing paste while others use a more solid dough. In Austria, spit cakes are known as Prügelkrapfen; in Germany there are two varieties called Baumkuchen and Baumstriezel; in Hungary kürtőskalács; in Romania Kürtőskalács (also known as Colac/Cozonac secuiesc, or Baumstriezel); in the Czech Republic and Slovakia trdelník; in Sweden spettekaka; in Lithuania šakotis, bankuchenas or baumkuchenas; and in Poland sękacz.

Baumkuchen and Baumstriezel are German varieties of spit cake. Baumkuchen is prepared in the shape of a tree and is served sliced in rings that resemble tree rings, and thus gave the cake its German name, Baumkuchen, which translates as "tree cake". Baumstriezel is made of a batter made with yeast, and has a caramel crust while the Baumkuchen is not baked with yeast but with baking powder, and has no crust of caramelized sugar. Baumkuchen has as its ingredients eggs, marzipan, sugar, butter and flour. Baumkuchen is served plain or with white sugar icing or covered with chocolate. This type of cake is known in Austria as Prügelkrapfen and in Luxembourg called Baamkuch, traditionally served on special occasions, such as weddings. The Austrian Prügelkrapfen or Prügeltorte is a variety of spit cake with a liquid base dough poured on the spit.

Kürtőskalács is made of a dough made of wheat flour, egg, yeast, often extra egg yolks, milk, and butter, iced with sugar. The sugar will be caramelised, creating a hard, crisp brown layer on the cake's surface.

Its Slovak version is called trdelník or Skalický trdelník , and it was registered in December 2007 as PGI (protected geographical indication) in the European Union. The registration application with the detailed description of the product was published in April 2007 in the Official Journal of the European Union. It is made from rolled dough that is wrapped around a stick, then grilled and topped with sugar and walnut mix.

Šakotis is the Lithuanian traditional spit cake, It is a cake made with a loose dough of butter, eggs, flour, sugar, and cream, poured on the spit, forming "stalactites" when dropping from the spit. In Lithuanian means "peaked" or "branchy" or "branched tree" due to its conical shape resembling a pine tree, and with the drips looking like the tree branches. It is baked in a time- and labor-intensive process, by pouring layers of dough onto a rotating spit in a special open oven or over an open fire.

Spettekaka is a traditional dessert of a Southern part of Sweden, mostly of Scania region and is an important part of culinary heritage. Spettekaka is different in that the dough is made of potato flour. The ingredients are potato starch flour, sugar and eggs. The rest of the process is similar, the thin dough forming layers when it is slowly poured onto a rotating cone shaped spit. The final layer of pink or white icing can be applied at the end of baking. The Spettekaka is a brittle and dry variety of this dessert, somewhat similar in consistency to meringue; it is light, airy and crisp. Those cakes range in size anywhere from a few inches to several feet in height and over a foot in diameter. Cutting Spettekaka with a regular knife is nearly impossible due to crumbling, therefore a special saw-like knife is used. During celebrations there is a tradition to cut out small rectangle windows from the sides of the cake, keeping the whole shape intact as long as possible.

Spit cake varieties

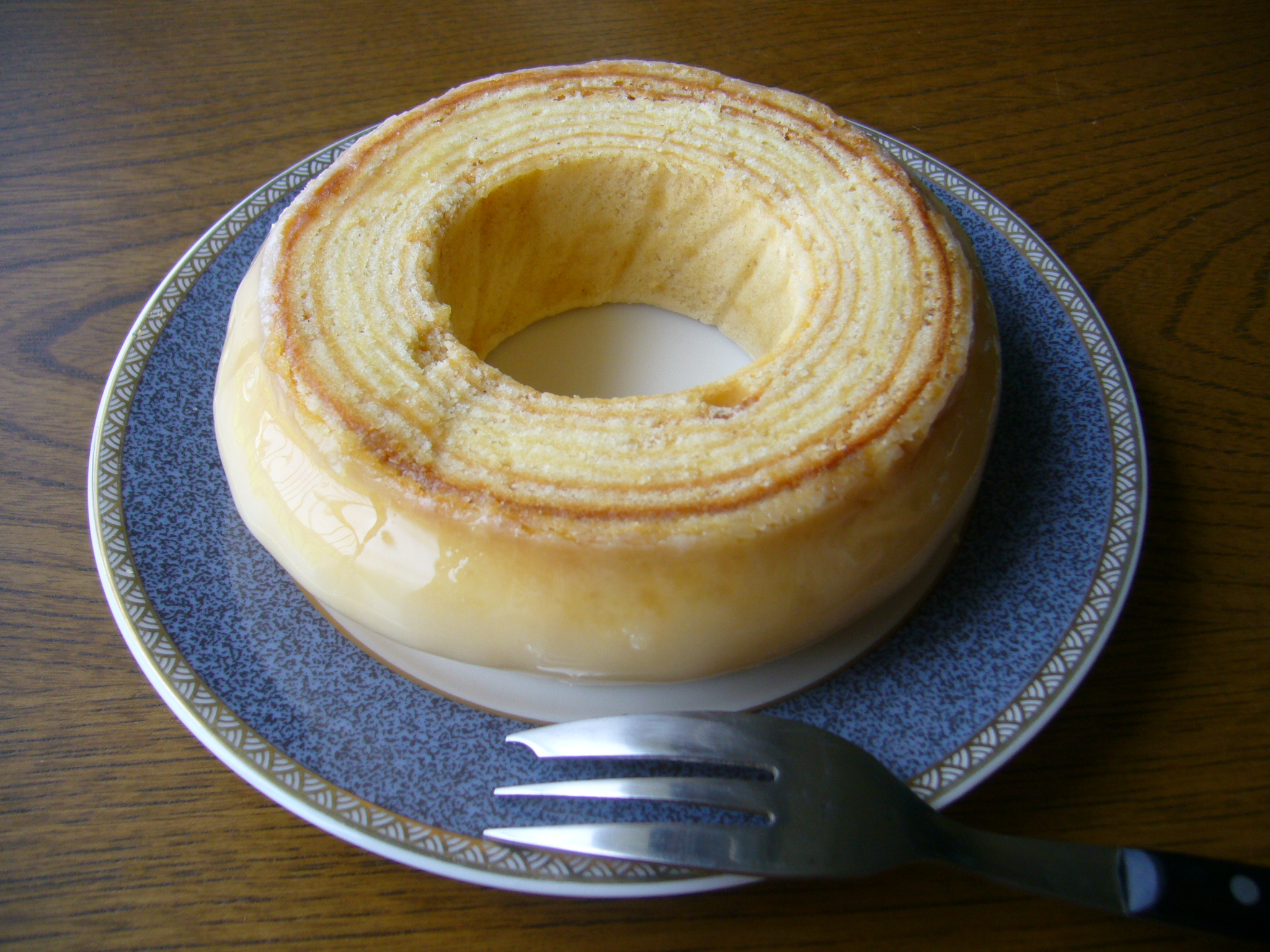
Baumkuchen is layered

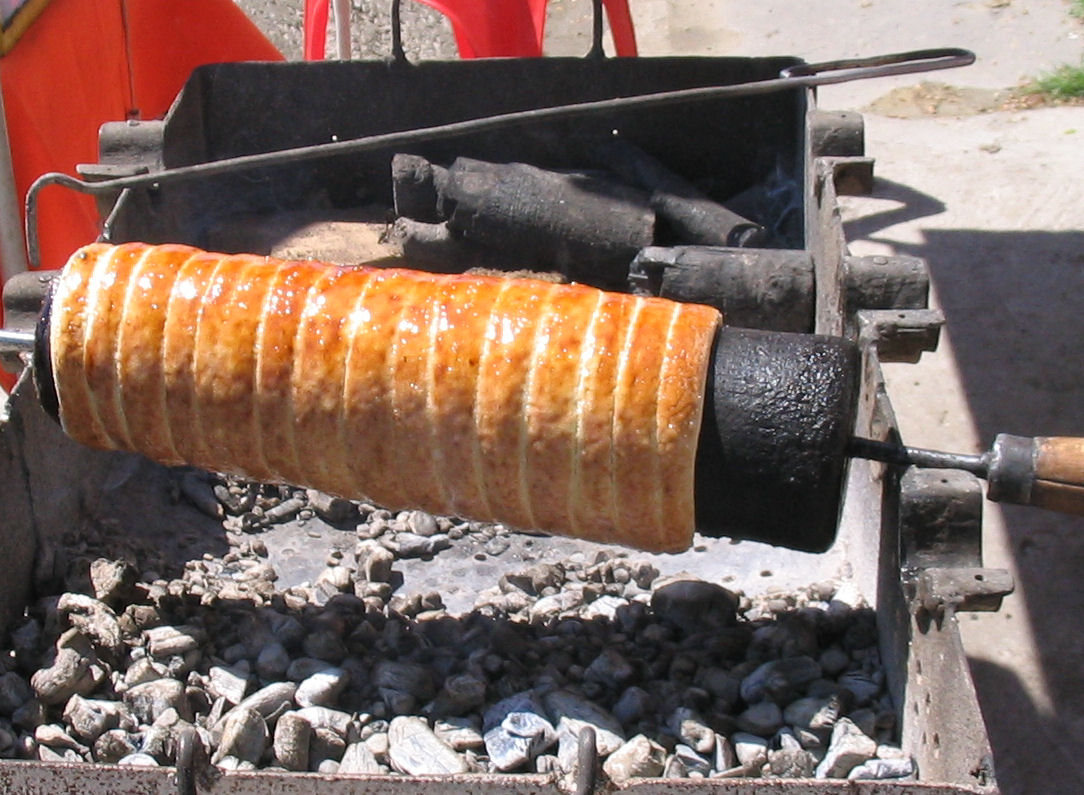
The charcoal imparts a distinct flavour to the cake

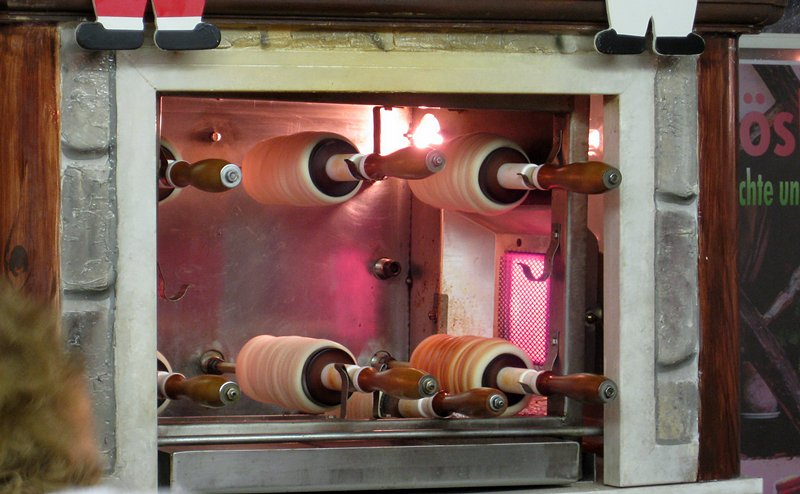
Baumstrietzel cooked at Weihnachtsmarkt in electric oven

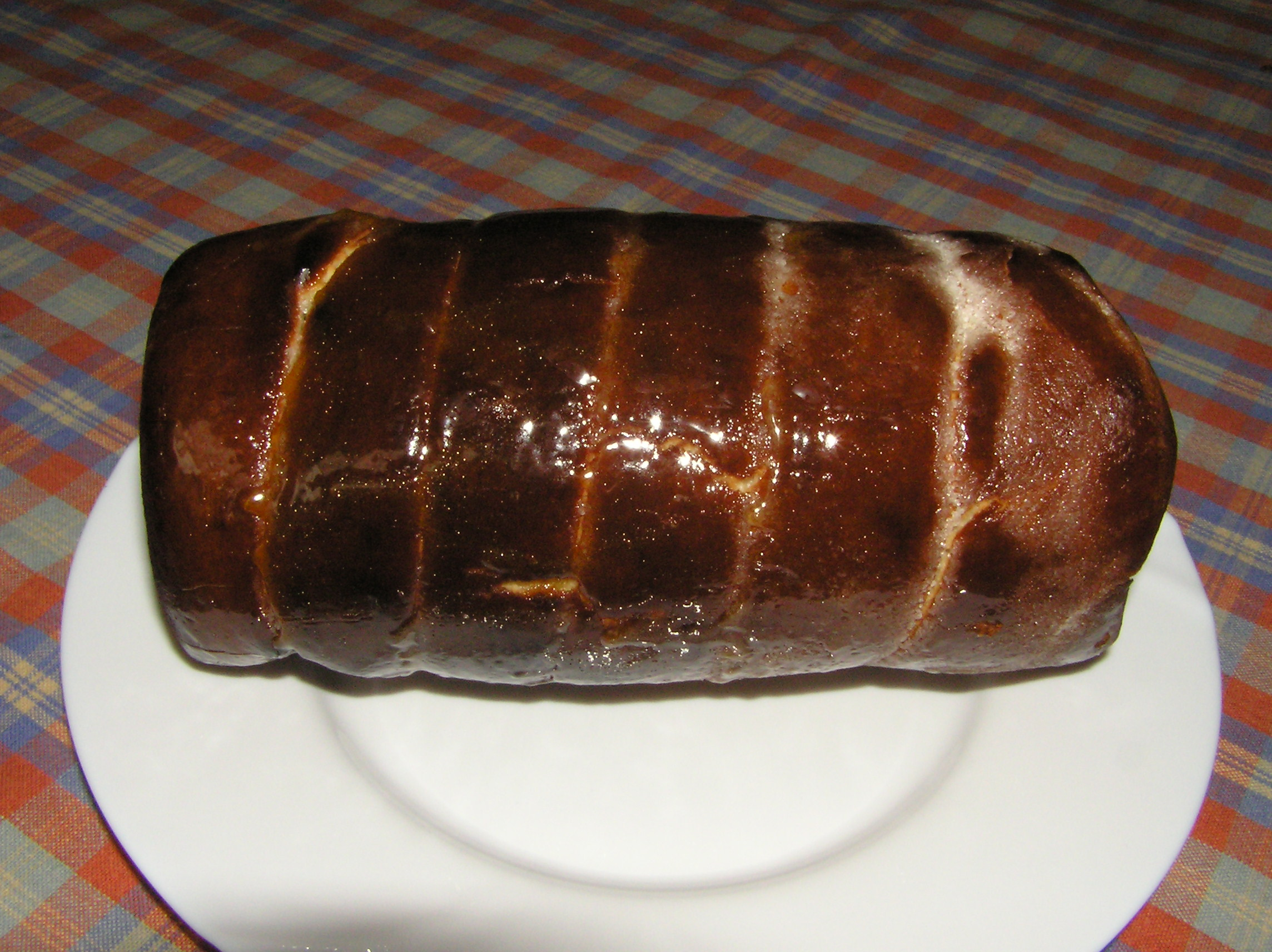
Baumstriezel

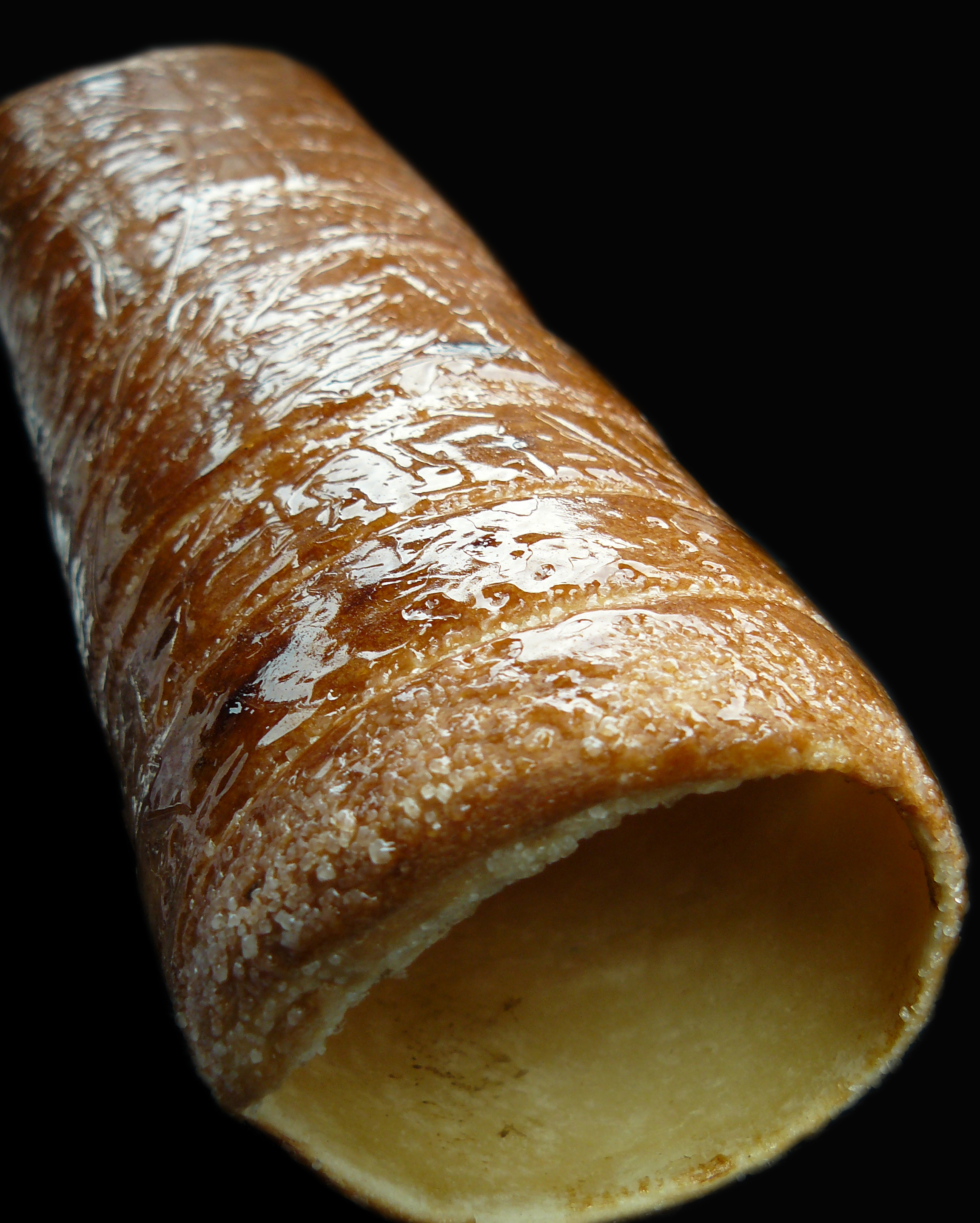
Kürtőskalács

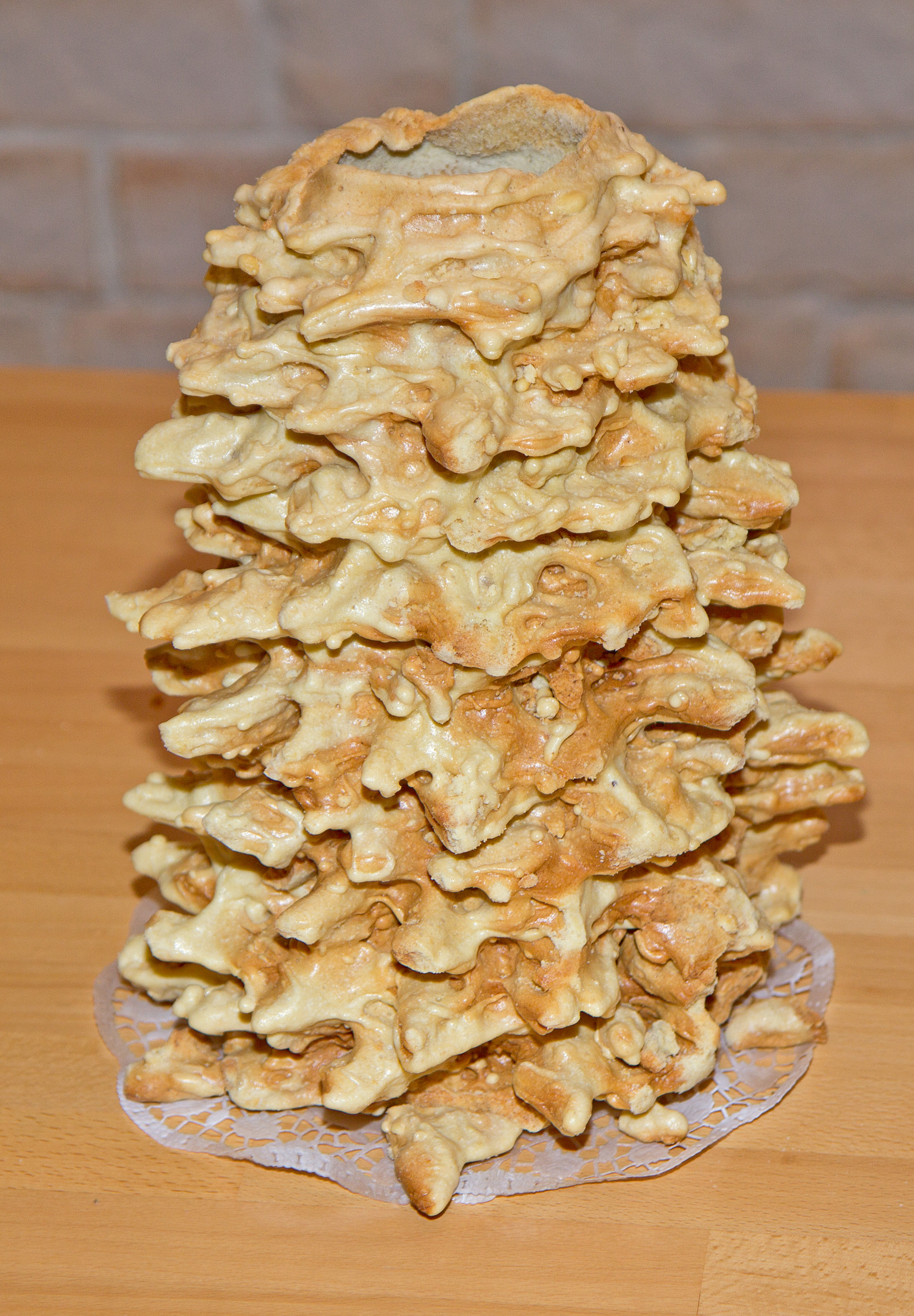
Šakotis

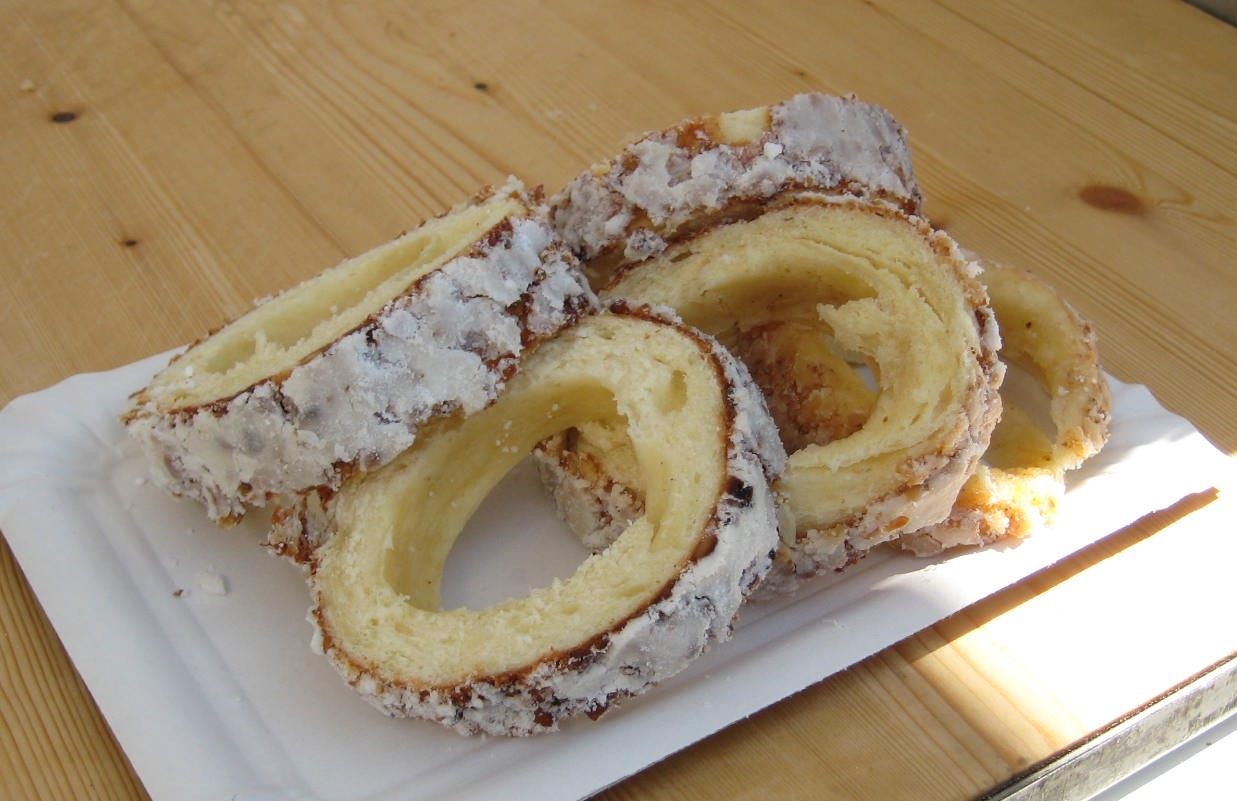
Trdelník slices

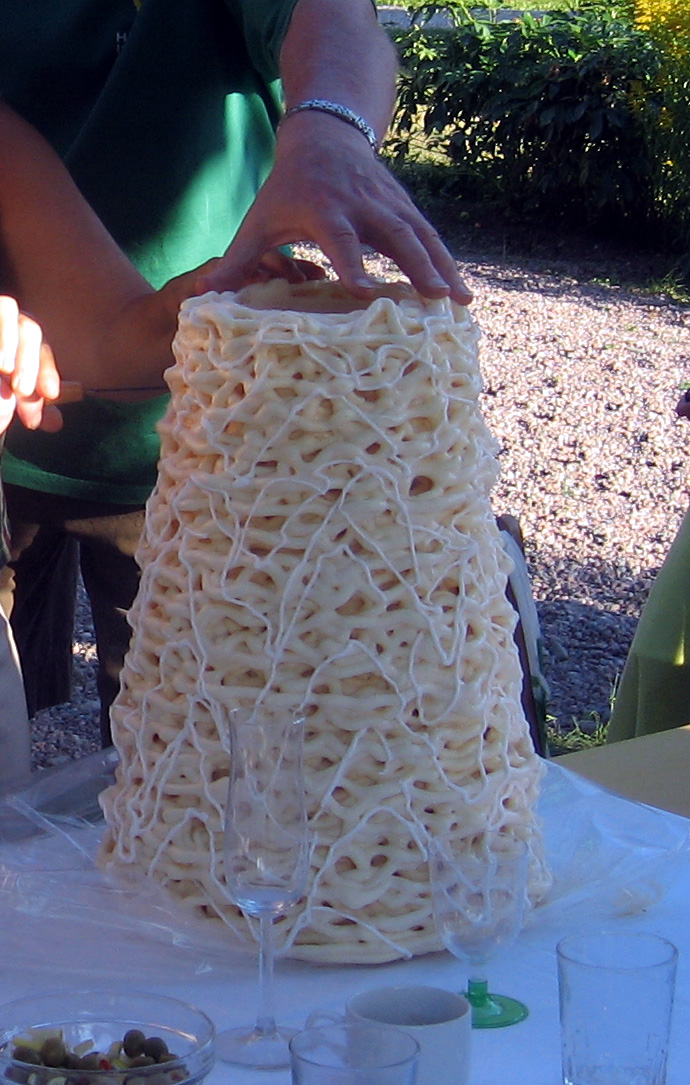
Spettekaka

== See also ==
- Dobos torte
- List of cakes
- List of pastries
- List of spit-roasted foods
- Prinzregententorte
- Spekkoek
