= Baumkuchen =

German cake

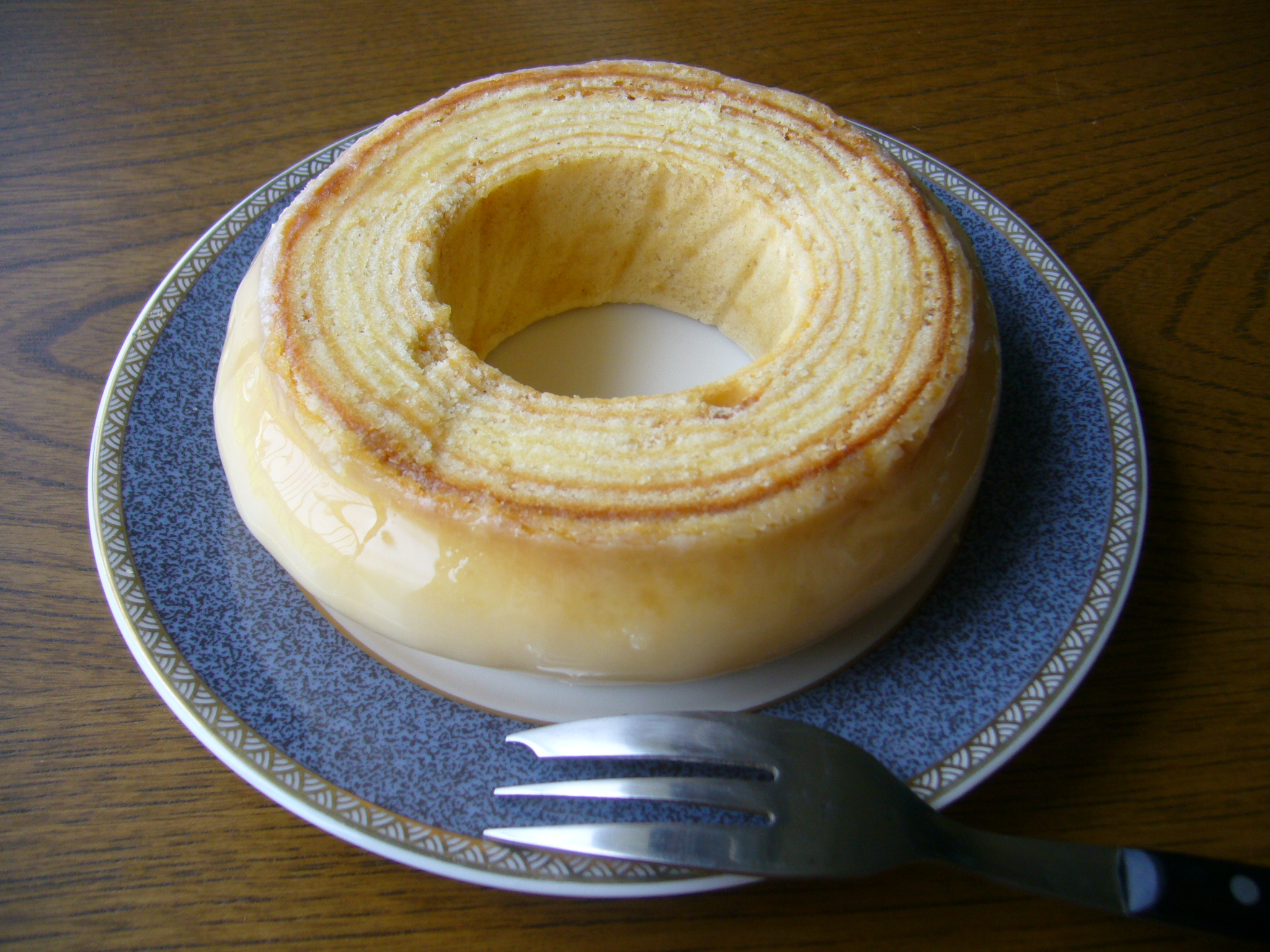
Baumkuchen, with characteristic circular tree ring markings

Baumkuchen (German pronunciation: [ˈbaʊ̯mˌkuːxn̩]) is a kind of spit cake from German cuisine. It is also a popular dessert in Japan. The characteristic rings that appear in its slices resemble tree rings, and give the cake its German name, Baumkuchen, which literally translates to "tree cake" or "log cake".

== History ==
Its prototype is thought to have been an ancient Greek pastry called obelias (Ancient Greek: ὀβελίας, romanized: obelías, lit. 'skewer', 'spit stick', 'rotisserie stick'); it got this name from the method of baking, made by wrapping and baking the dough around a wooden stick, an "obelisks" (spits), as it was rotated over the fire (see also Souvla), and because it was sold for an obol (ὀβολός; a small value coin).

In Ein neues Kochbuch (lit. "A New Cookbook"), the first cookbook written for professional chefs, by the German chef Marx Rumpolt, there is a recipe for Baumkuchen. This publication puts the origin of Baumkuchen as far back at 1581, the year the cookbook was first published.

Some less substantiated theories suggest that the modern dish of Baumkuchen (lit. "Tree Cake") was invented by German bakers in the town of Salzwedel, or that it began as a Hungarian wedding cake.

== Characteristics ==
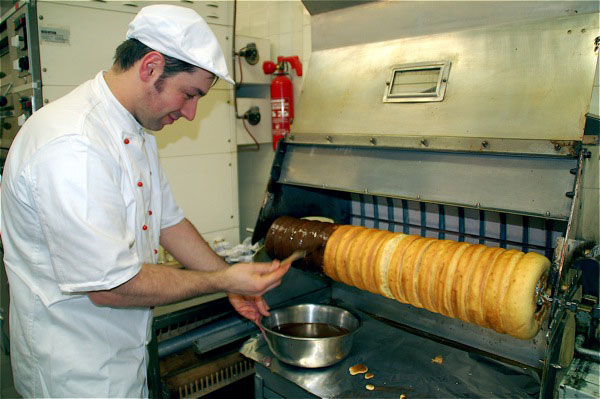
Baumkuchen baked on a spit. The baker is adding a chocolate coating to the outside of the finished cake.

Traditionally, Baumkuchen is made on a spit by brushing on even layers of batter and then rotating the spit around a heat source. Each layer is allowed to brown before a new layer of batter is poured. When the cake is removed and sliced, each layer is divided from the next by a golden line, resembling the growth rings in a tree cross-section. A typical Baumkuchen is made up of 15 to 20 layers of batter. However, the layering process for making Baumkuchen can continue until the cakes are quite large. Skilled pastry chefs have been known to create cakes with 25 layers and weighing over 100 pounds (45 kg). When cooked on a spit, it is not uncommon for a finished Baumkuchen to be 3–4 feet (0.91–1.22 m) tall.

Baumkuchen ingredients are typically butter, eggs, sugar, vanilla, salt, and flour. Baking powder is not considered a traditional ingredient. The ratio of flour, butter and eggs is typically 1:1:2 respectively (i.e., 100 grams of flour, 100 grams of butter and 200 grams of eggs). The recipe can be varied by adding other ingredients, such as ground nuts, honey, marzipan, nougat, and rum or brandy, to the batter or filling. Additionally, Baumkuchen may be covered with sugar or chocolate glaze. With some recipes, the fully baked and cooled Baumkuchen is first coated with marmalade or jam, and then covered with chocolate.

== Variations ==
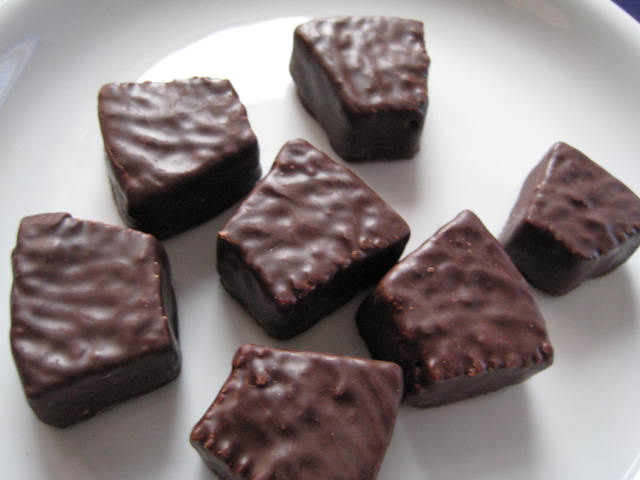
Chocolate-coated Baumkuchenspitzen

Baumkuchenspitzen, German for "Tree Cake Tips", are miniature versions of Baumkuchen; for these, the slices of the whole cake are cut into small pieces that are then typically coated in chocolate and packaged.

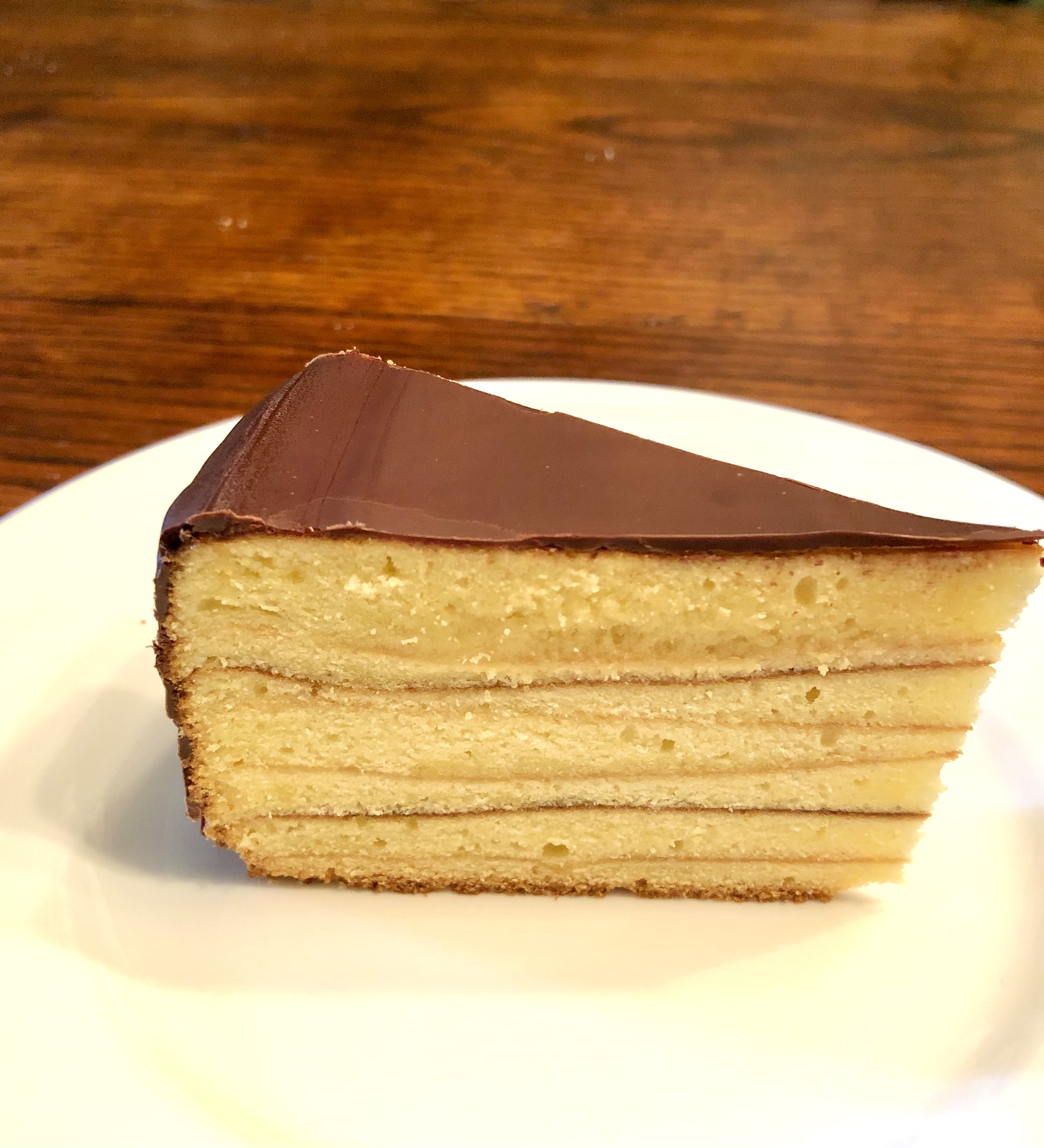
A slice of Schichttorte, made by pouring a thin layer of cake batter on top of the previous one and quickly cooking it under the broiler

A simpler horizontally layered version of the cake called a "Schichttorte" also exists. It is baked without a spit and thus does not have circular rings but horizontal layers. The horizontally layered version results in a Baumkuchen that is more similar in shape to conventional cakes. It can also be baked in a conventional household oven that has a broiler inside, whereas the traditional spit version requires special equipment normally not available in an average household. However, unlike with the spit variant, the Schichttorte cross section is less reminiscent of tree rings.

== Baumkuchen in Japan ==
Baumkuchen is one of the most popular cakes in Japan, where it is called baumukūhen (バウムクーヘン). It is a popular return present in Japan for wedding guests because of its ring shape. The shape is connected to tree rings, which symbolises longevity and prosperity in Japan.

It was first introduced to Japan by the German Karl Joseph Wilhelm Juchheim. Juchheim was in the Chinese city of Qingdao during World War I, being present in the city when British and Japanese forces commenced the Siege of Qingdao. Karl served as a private in the Landsturm. After the fall of Qingdao, Karl was sent to prisoner-of-war camps in Japan. After the war, Juchheim started making and selling the traditional confection at a German exhibition in Hiroshima in 1919. He might have baked Japan's first Baumkuchen before the exhibition on Ninoshima. Continued success allowed him to move to Yokohama and open a bakery-store, but it was destroyed in the Great Kanto Earthquake of 1923, thus forcing him to move his operations to Kobe, where he stayed until the end of World War II. Some years later, his wife returned to help a Japanese company open a chain of bakeries under the Juchheim name that further helped spread Baumkuchen's popularity in Japan and is still in operation.

== See also ==
- Layer cake
- Šakotis – traditional Lithuanian spit cake
- Bolo de rolo – Brazilian cake with similarly thin layers, rolled instead
- Media related to Baumkuchen at Wikimedia Commons
