= Trdelník =

European spit cake

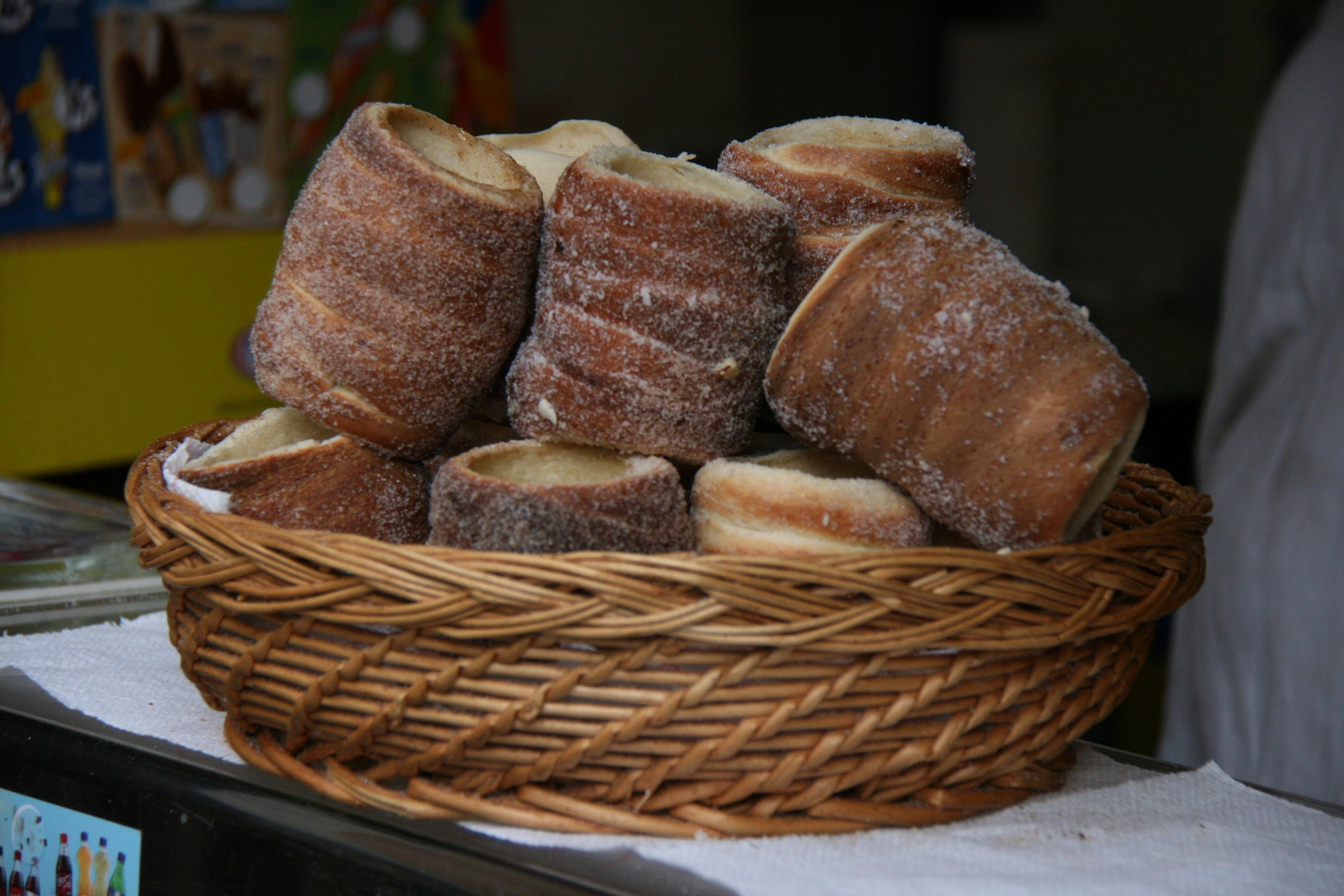
- Type: Spit cake
- Place of origin: Kingdom of Hungary
- Region or state: Hungary; Székely Land (Romania); Skalica (Slovakia); Czech Republic
- Main ingredients: Dough; sugar; walnuts

Trdelník (Czech pronunciation: [ˈtr̩dɛlɲiːk]; or rarely trdlo, trozkol, or chimney cake) is a kind of spit cake and variant of Kürtőskalács. It is made from dough that is wrapped around a stick, then baked and topped with sugar and walnut mix.

== Origin ==
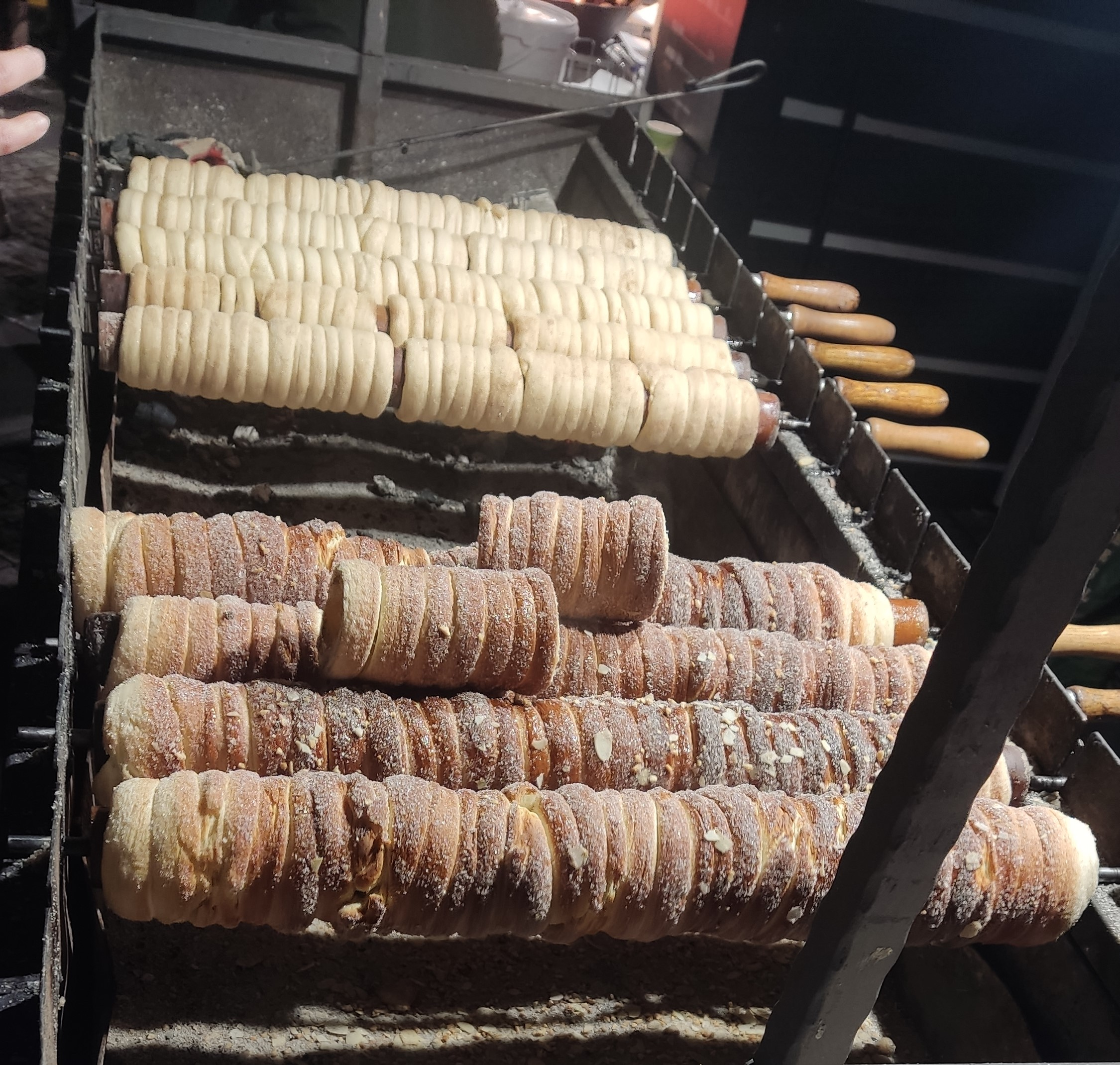
Trdelník being baked in a stall in Wenceslas Square, Prague

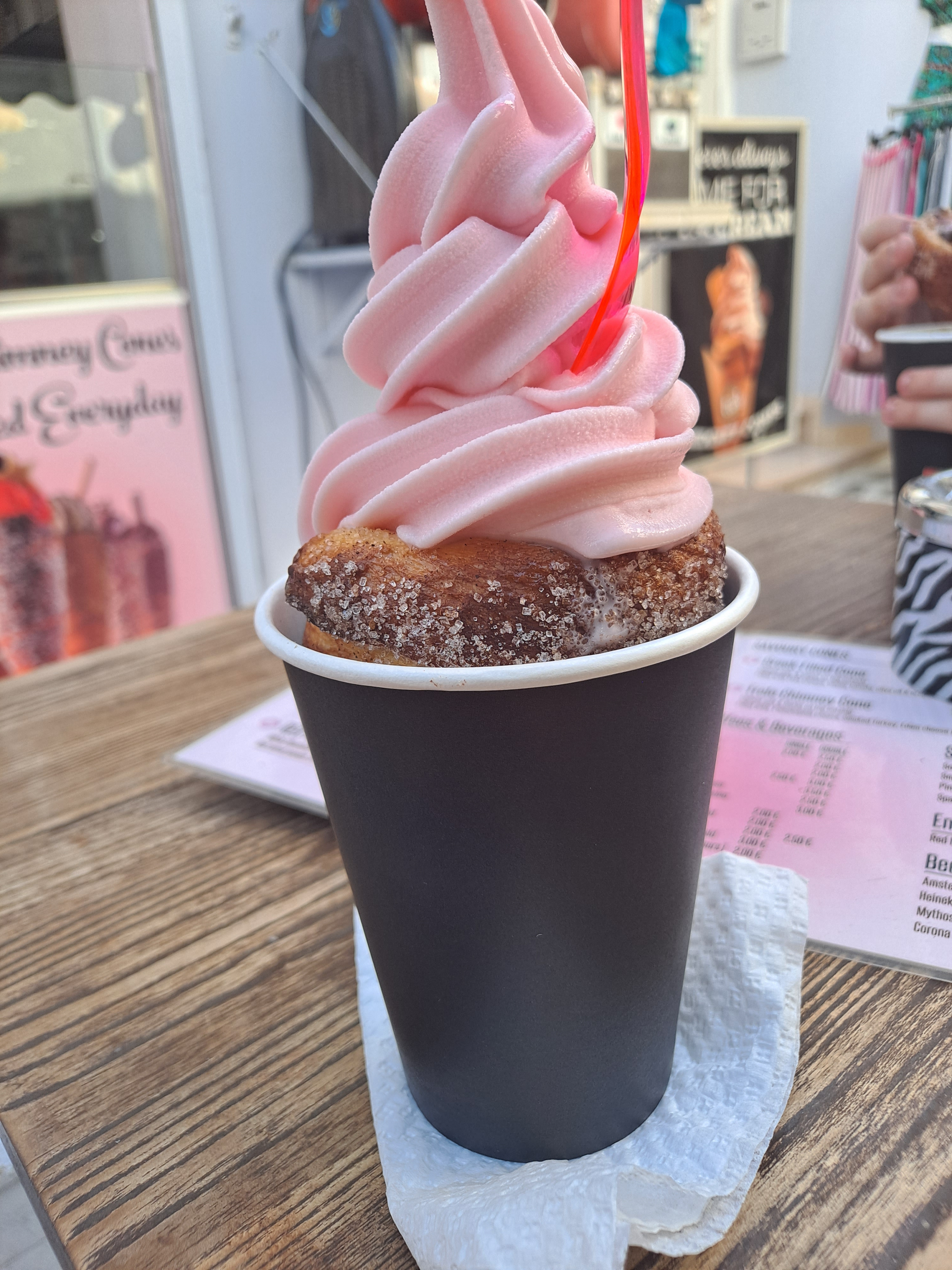
Trdelník filled with ice cream in Prague

Trdelník has its origins in the northern part of the historical Kingdom of Hungary. In the mid-19th century, it was known as a Slovak dish, and in the 20th century as a Moravian dish. A similar pastry was also popular in the Hungarian-speaking part of Transylvania (in today's Romania), where it is called kürtőskalács. The word trdelník is of Czech-Slovak origin. The root of this word, trdlo, is the name of the wooden tool the cake ingredients are wrapped around during baking (which gives it its traditional hollow shape), and it can also mean "simpleton" in English.

In the 21st century, the confection became popular among tourists in the Czech Republic, Hungary and Slovakia. A variation of trdelník, with ice cream and toppings such as strawberries and chocolate, has been popularized by Prague cafés.

== Tourism in Prague ==
Baking of trdelník in Prague

Although trdelník is usually presented as a "traditional Czech cake" or "old Bohemian pastry", and mentions of český trdelník ("Czech trdelník") can be found in 20th-century literature, the confection is mostly mentioned in literature as a Slovak or Moravian, not Bohemian dish, and the spread of this dessert in Prague is recognized to have started more recently. Trdelník vendors, who have proliferated in Prague since the early 2000s, have been criticised by some locals, including journalist Janek Rubeš, as tourist traps that misleadingly present the dish as traditional.

== Skalický trdelník ==
The production of trdelník has a long tradition in the Slovak town of Skalica, near the border with the Moravian town of Hodonín. According to local tradition, the recipe was introduced there by the Transylvanian chef, count, and poet József Gvadányi, a retired Hungarian general who lived in the town from 1783 to 1801. The earliest surviving written reference to the pastry appears in a manuscript by Hungarian poet Gyula Juhász, who served as a professor at Skalica's gymnasium.

Skalický trdelník was registered in December 2007 as a protected geographical indication by the European Commission.

== See also ==
- List of spit-roasted foods
