= Domplatz (Passau) =

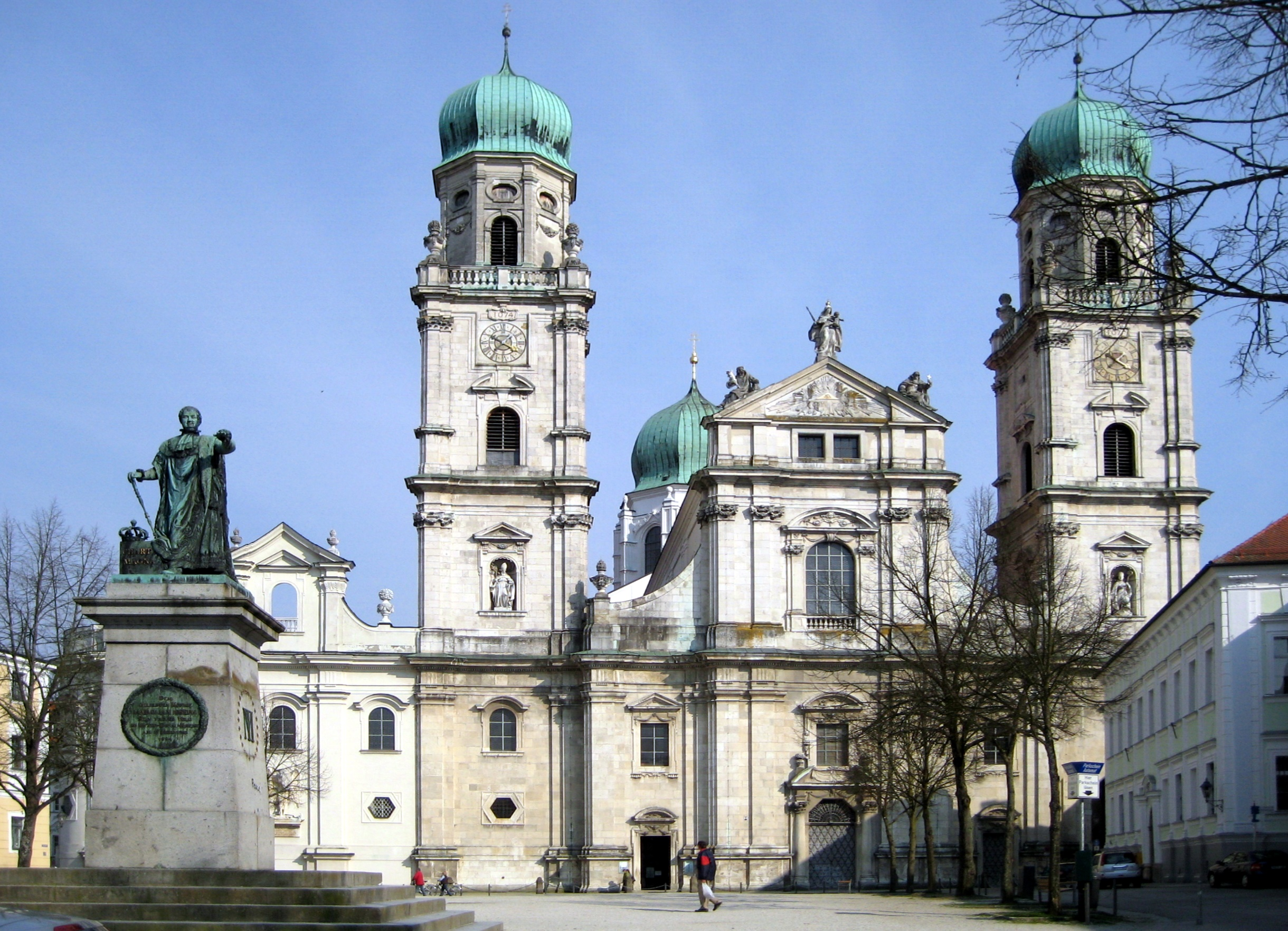
- The Domplatz

- Location within Bavaria
- Length: 113 m (371 ft)
- Width: 41 m (135 ft)
- Location: Passau, Bavaria, Germany
- Quarter: Altstadt
- Coordinates: 48.5730°N 13.4629°E

Construction
- Completion: 1150

The Domplatz in Passau is the area in front of the St. Stephen's Cathedral, in the historic Altstadt.

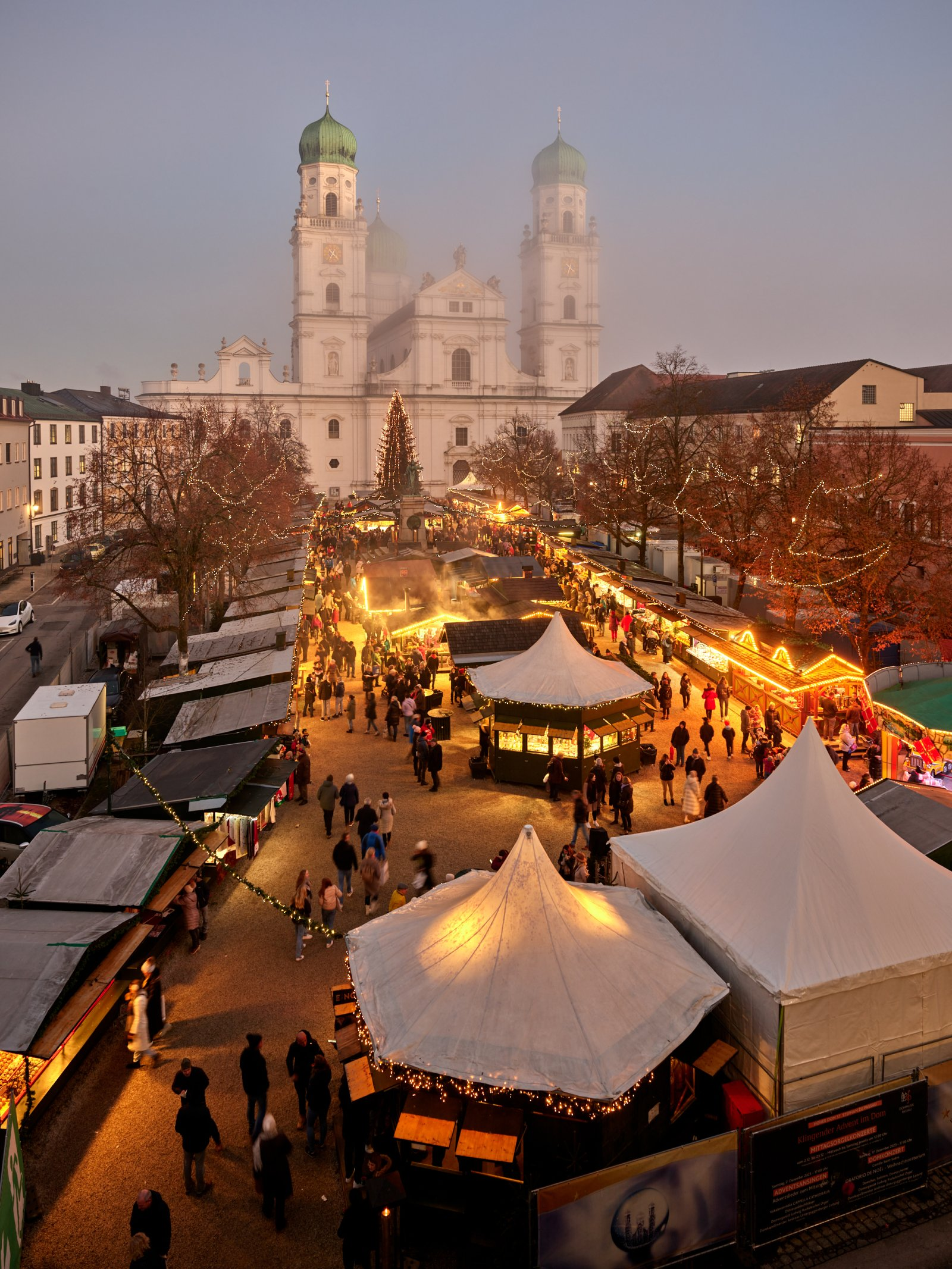
The christmas market from above

It was completed in 1150, however not publicly enterable until 1824. There are multiple buildings from the 17th to the 20th century, blocking open entrance without going through different other area.

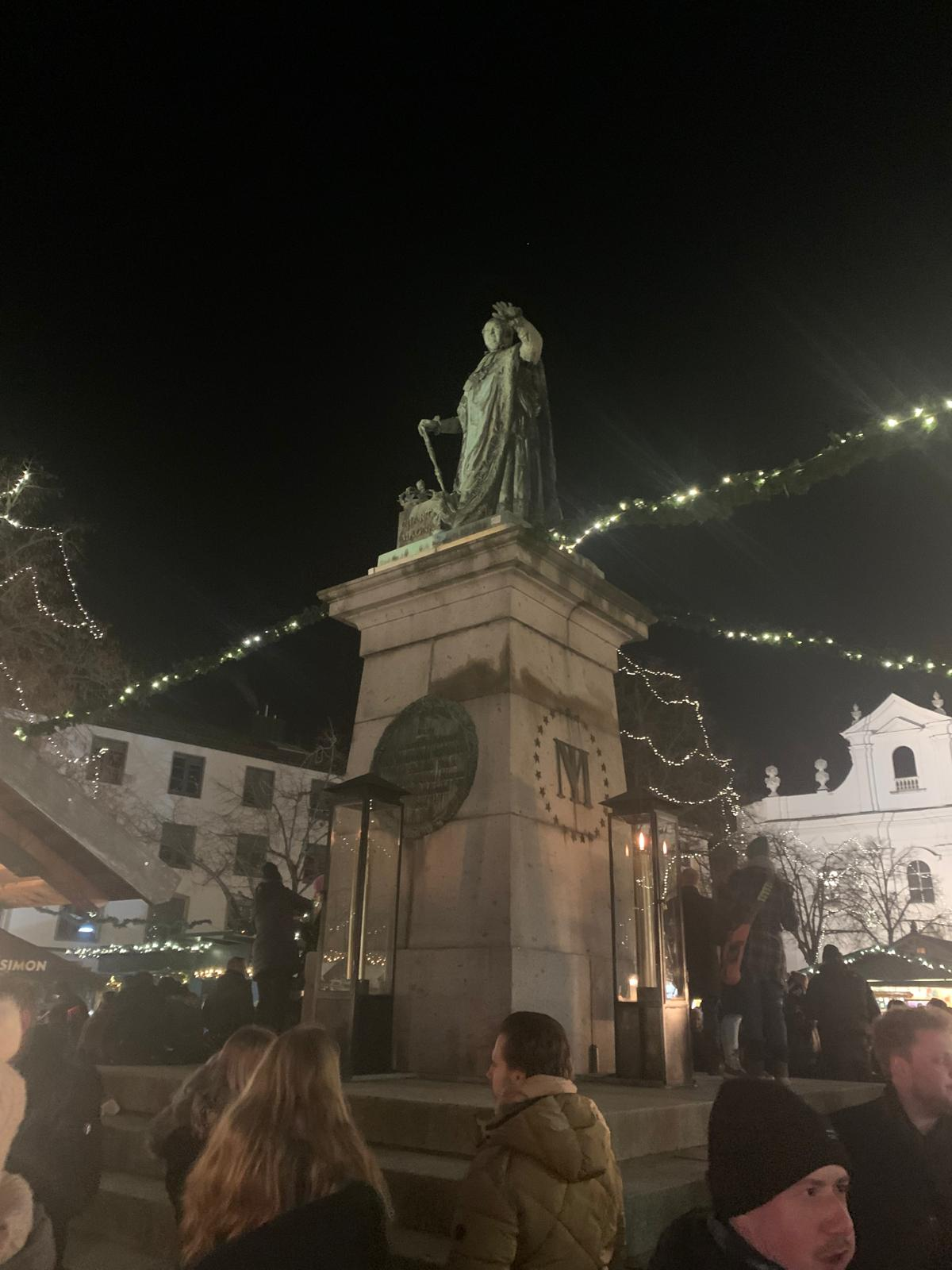
Statue of Maximilian the First

There is a statue dedicated to Maximilian the First of Bavaria in the centre. The area hosts a small weekly market every Saturday and, since 2004, an annually-held christmas market, the Christkindlesmarkt.

In 2013, the Domplatz was renovated for 720,000 Euros.
