= Christkindlesmarkt, Passau =

Annual Christmas market in Bavaria, Germany

Christkindlesmarkt of Passau Passauer Christkindlmarkt Bassaua Christkindlmarkt
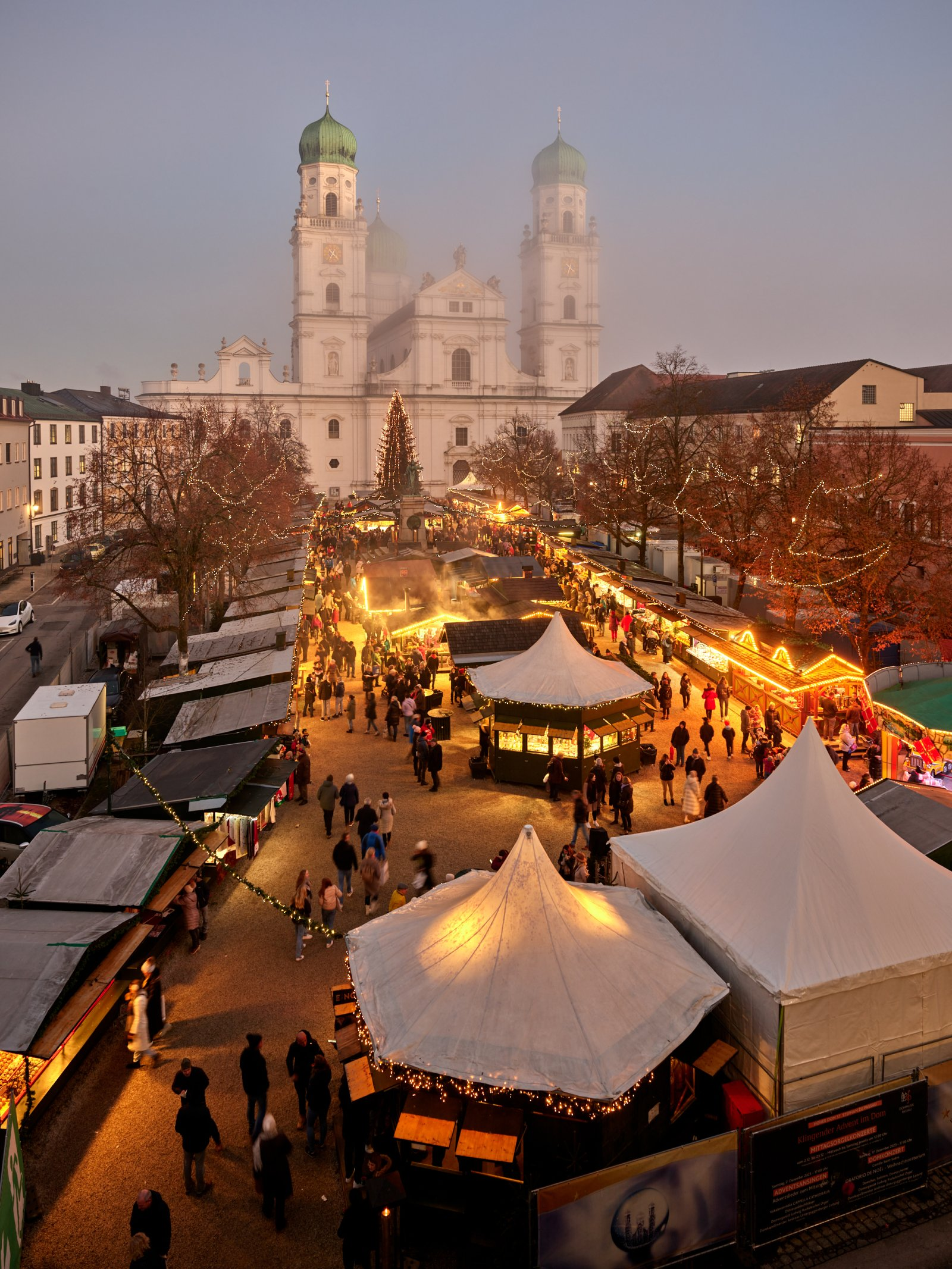
- Stands of the market from above
- Genre: Christmas market
- Date: 26 November – 22 December
- Locations: Domplatz, Passau, Germany
- Coordinates: 48.5730°N 13.4629°E
- Country: Bavaria; Germany
- Years active: 1924–present
- Inaugurated: 1 December 1924
- Capacity: around 60 stands
- Website: passauer-christkindlmarkt.de

The Christkindlesmarkt of Passau (German: Passauer Christkindlmarkt; Bavarian: Bassaua Christkindlmarkt) is an annually held Christmas market that takes place in Passau, Bavaria, Germany. It takes place during Advent in front of the St. Stephen's Cathedral, operating from the November 26th to December 22nd.

== History ==
The very first christmas market in Passau took place in 1924. Organized by the youth department of the Catholic Women's Association of Passau, it was still held in the Great Redoutensaal and only lasted three days. It often changed its location after 1948 until being moved in front of the St. Stephen's Cathedral in 2004, where it takes place every year since. The christmas market didn't take place in 2020 because of the pandemic.

== The market ==
The market is around 3,500 square meters big, taking up the whole Domplatz. It is traditionally opened by the bishop, mayor and district administrator of Passau. It has around 60 stands, with most of them selling food. It's built and decorated like a typical German christmas market, with the stands being made out of wood and having heavy yellow lights. At the end of the market, there is a massive christ mas tree, however only decorated with lights and no balls or toys. The market sells 1/2 meter long Bavarian sausages, Raclette, Mulled wine, Lebkuchen and also small German christmas dolls.

== Gallery ==
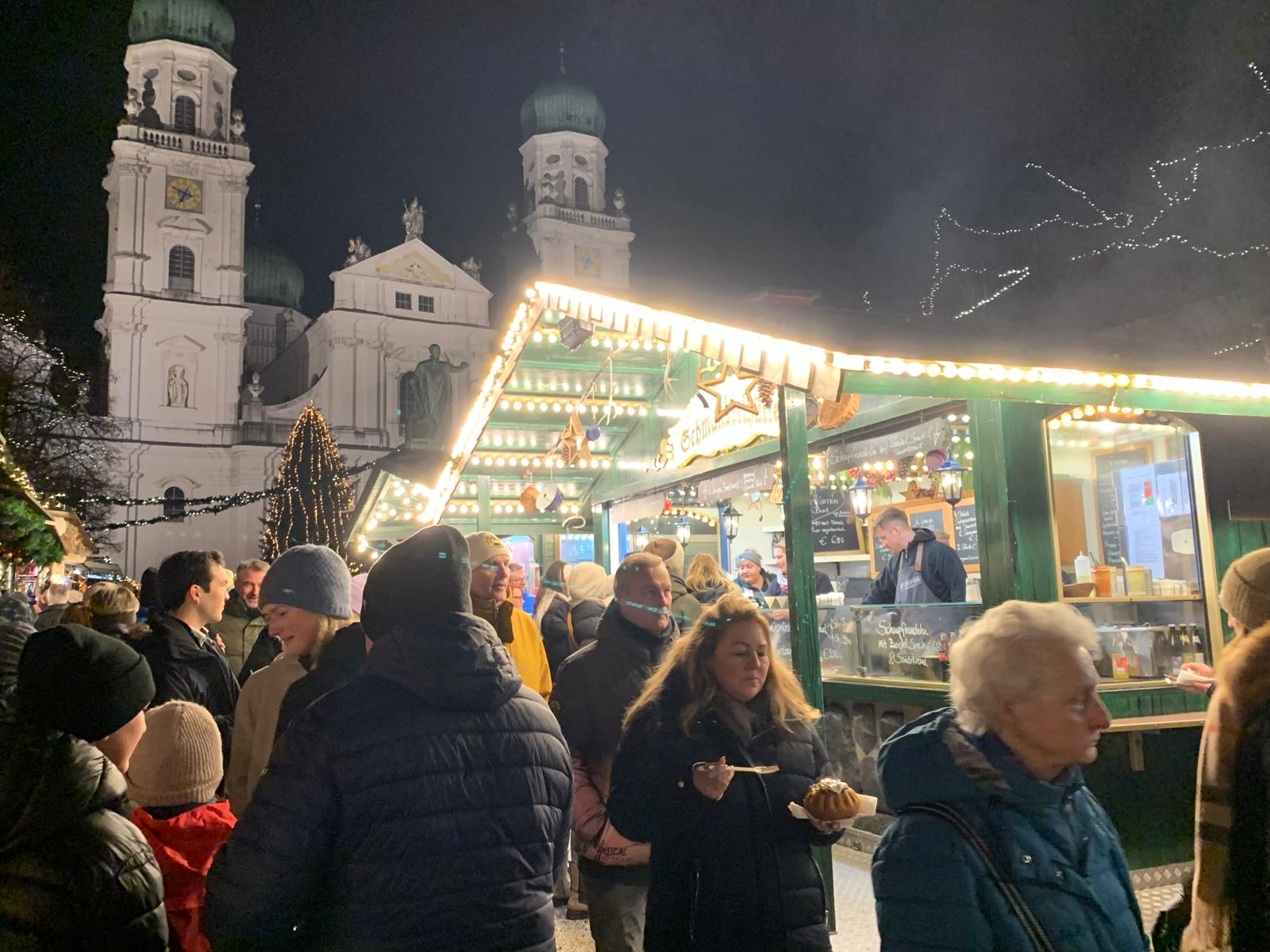
Stands at night

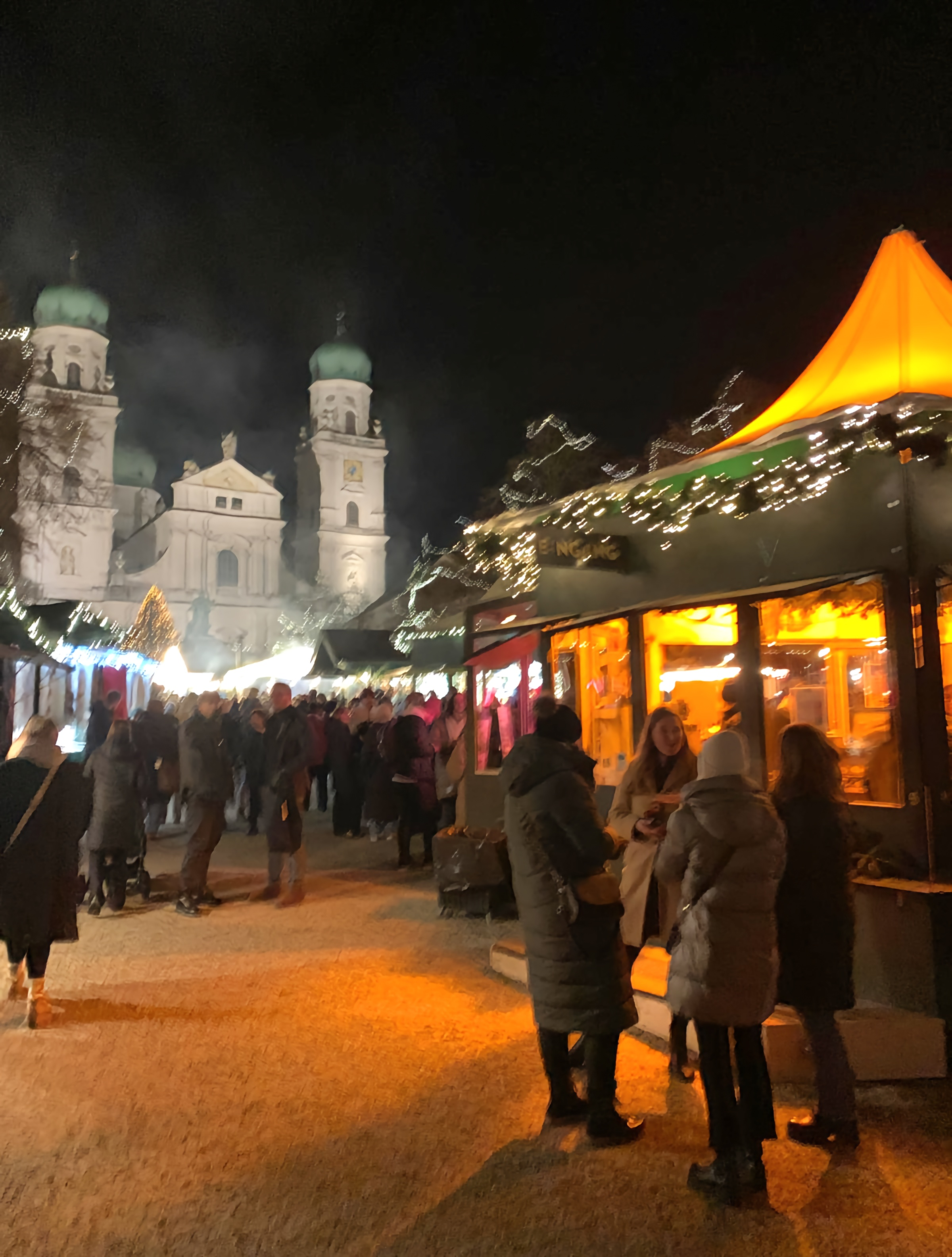
Entrance of the market

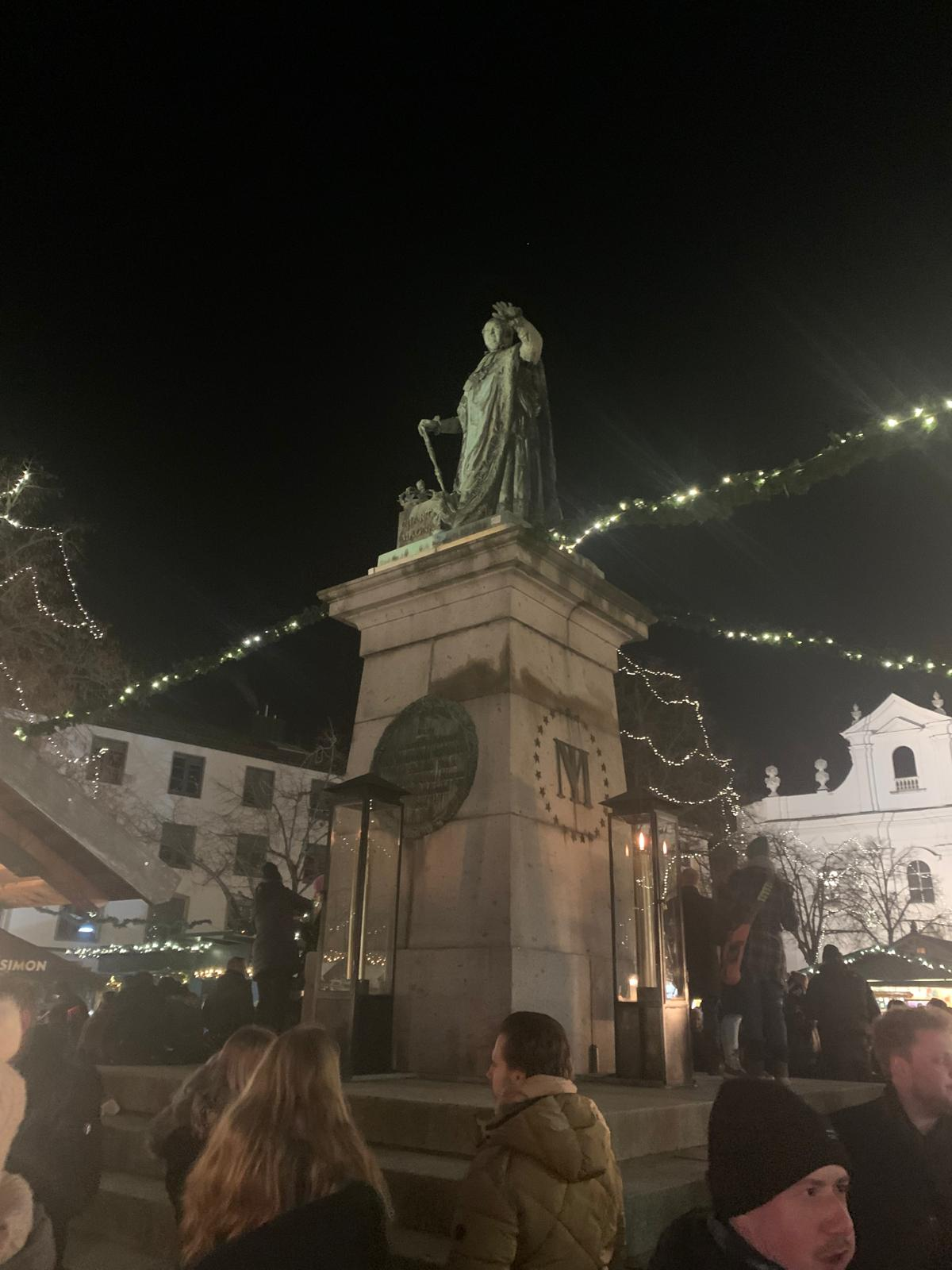
Statue of Maximilian the first in the centre

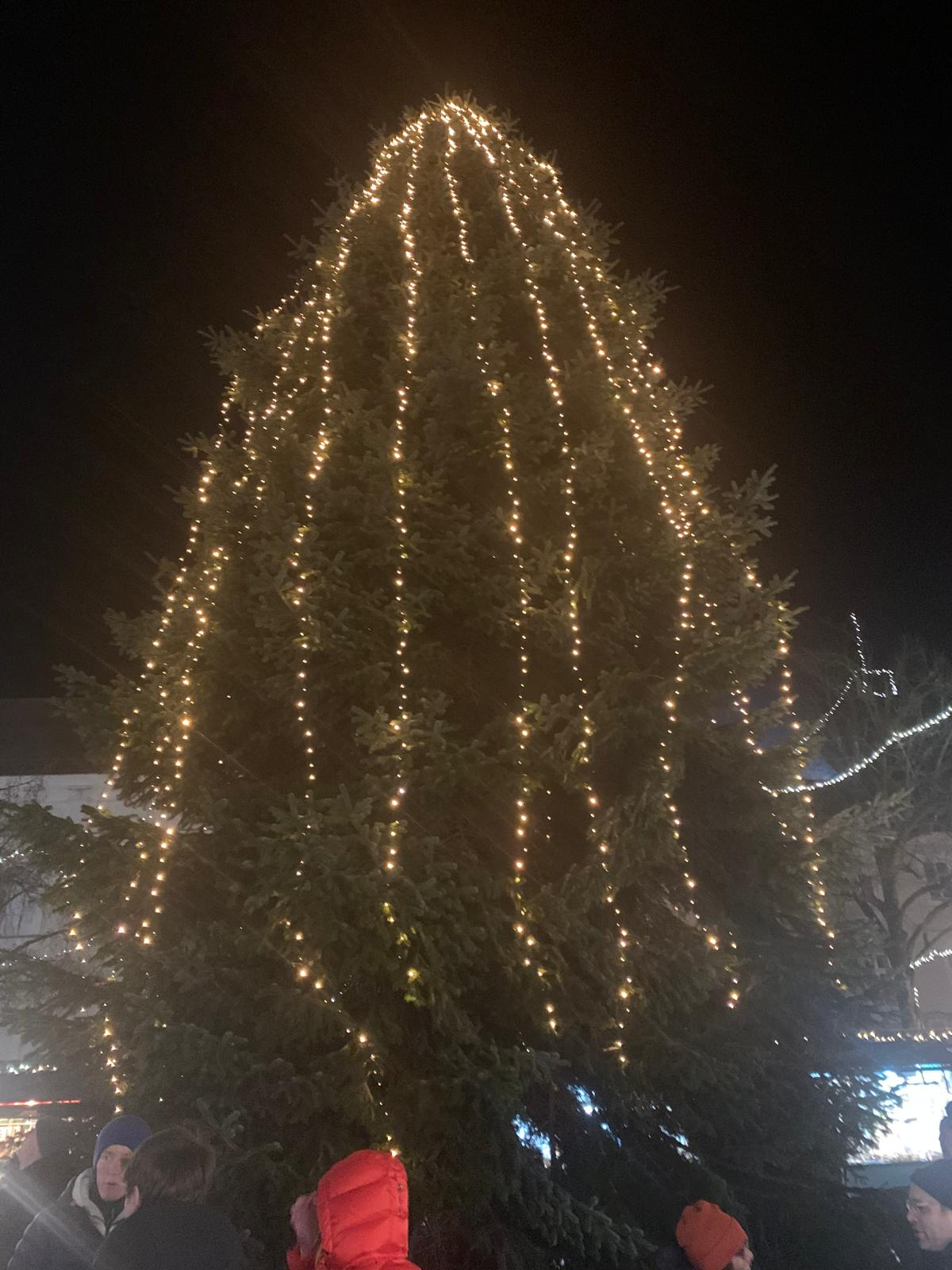
Lightly decorated christmas tree

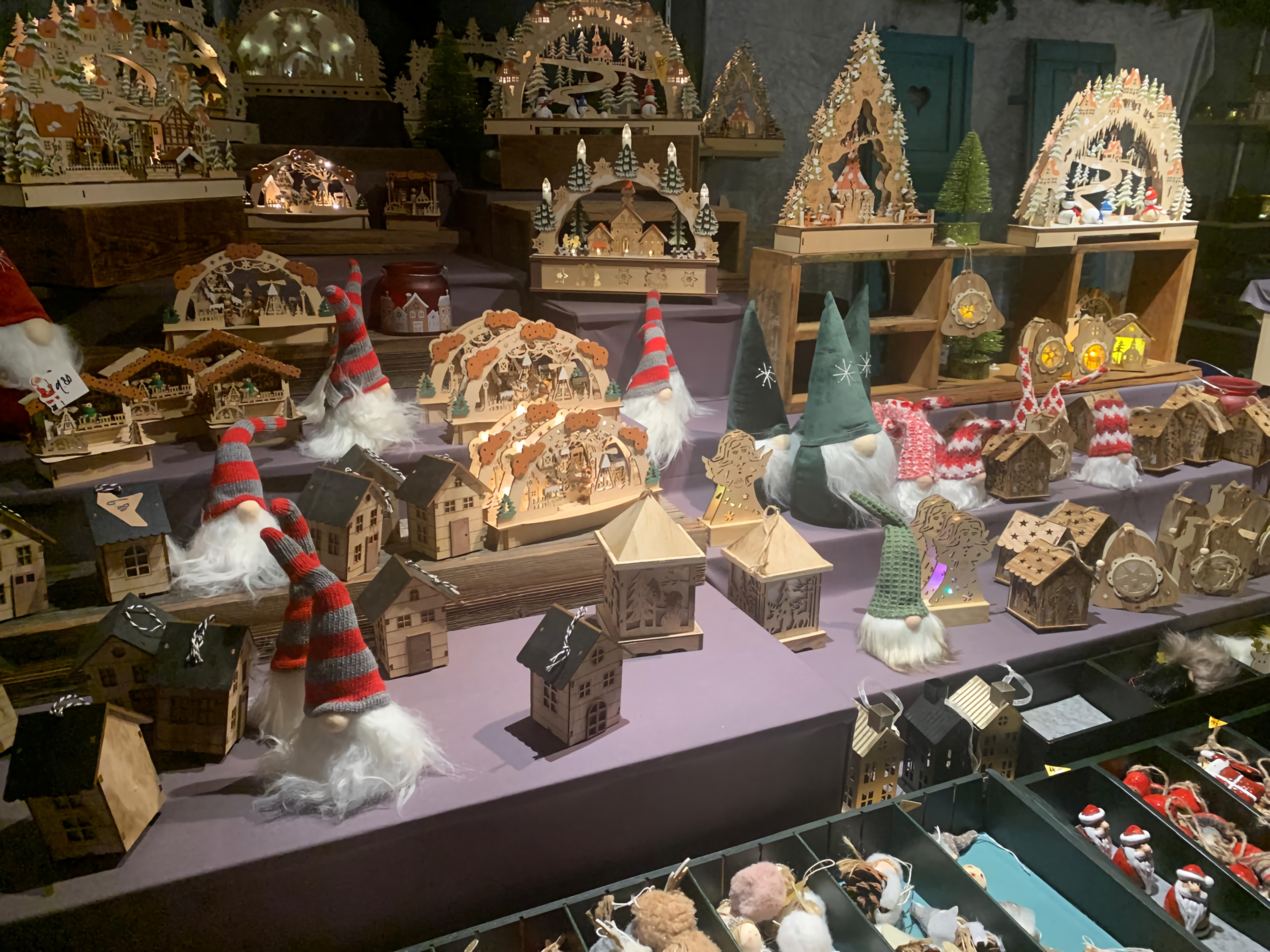
German christmas dolls

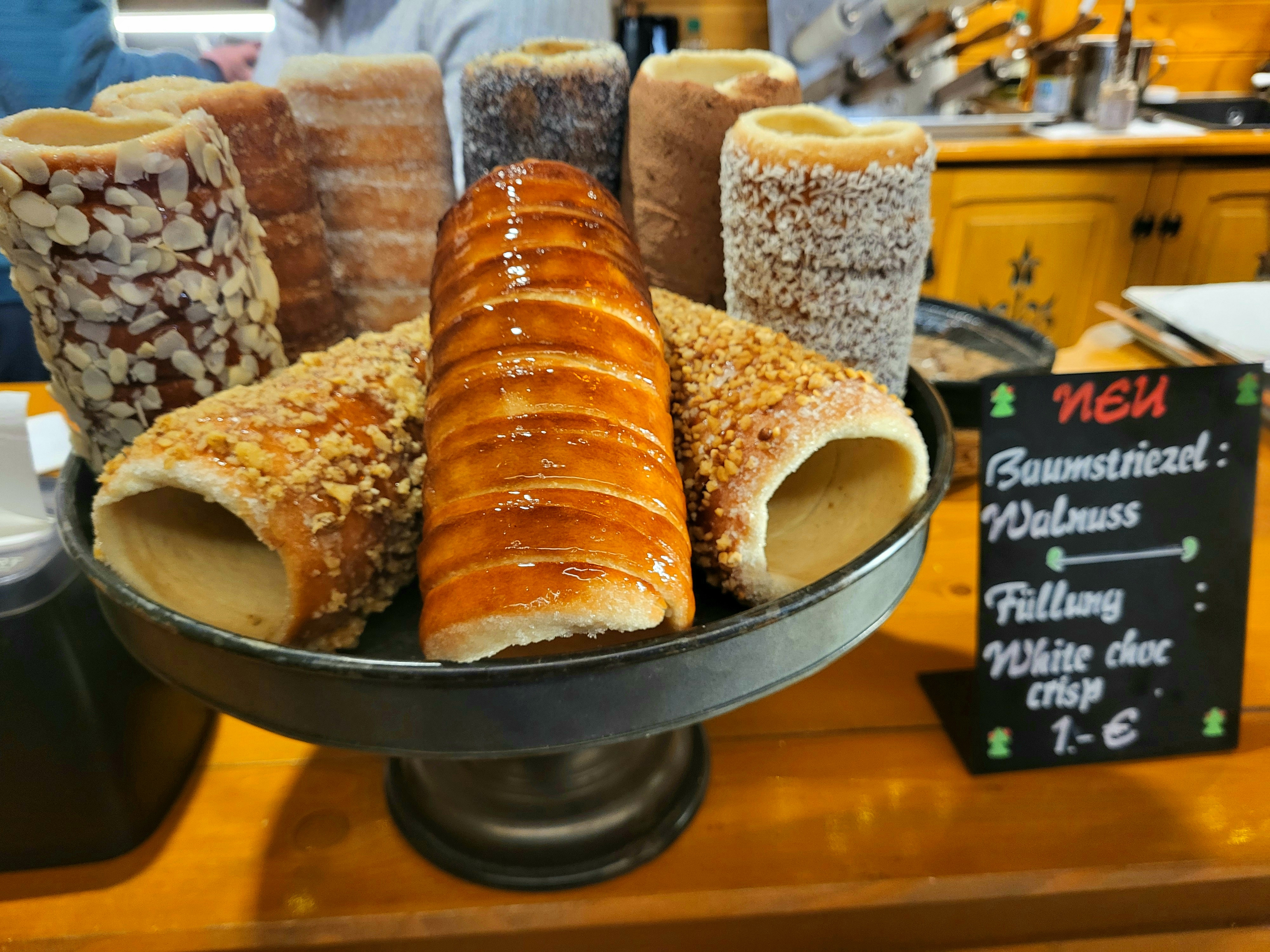
Baumstriezel at a food stand

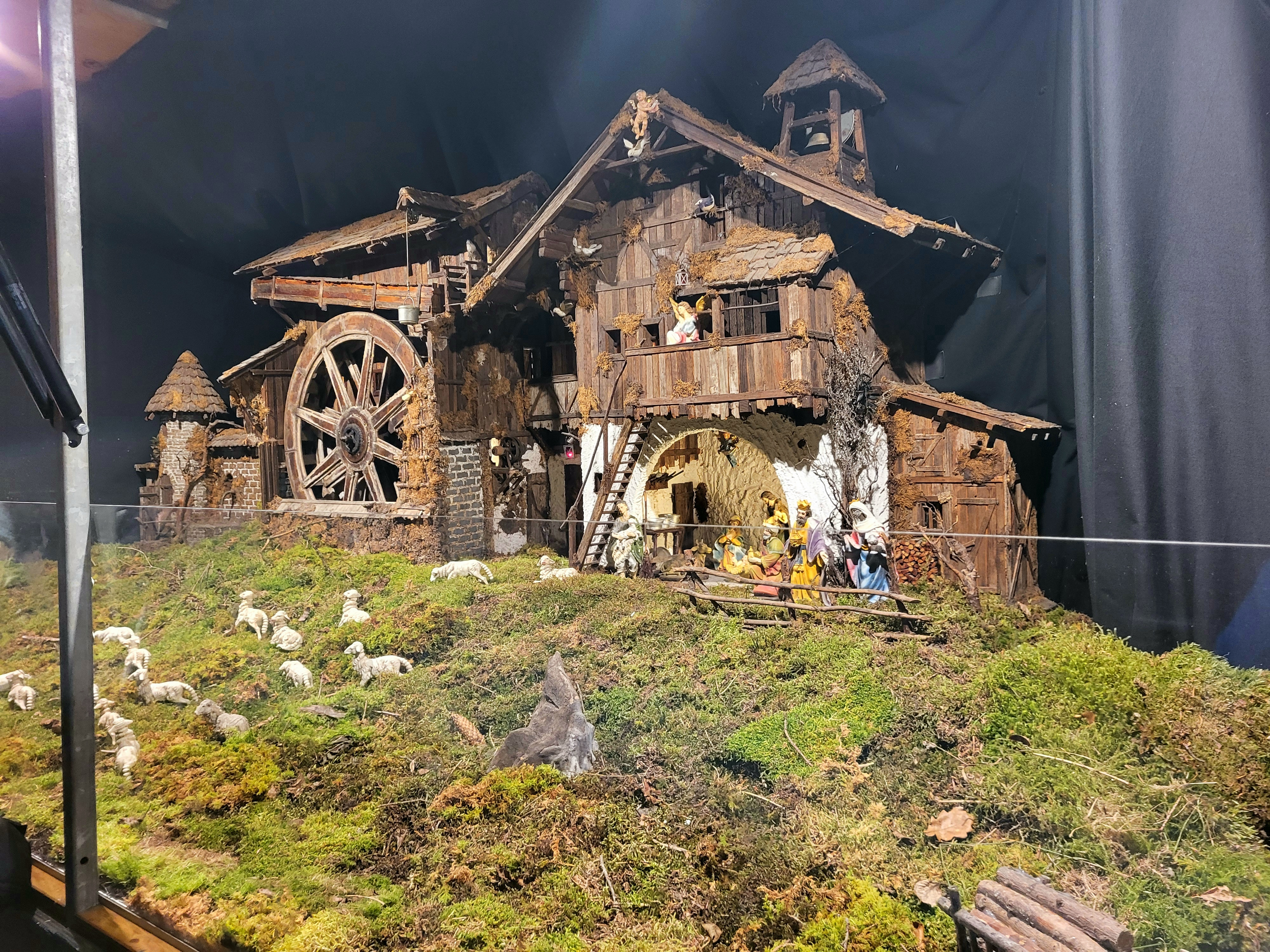
A nativity scene
