= Kürtőskalács =

Hungarian spit cake

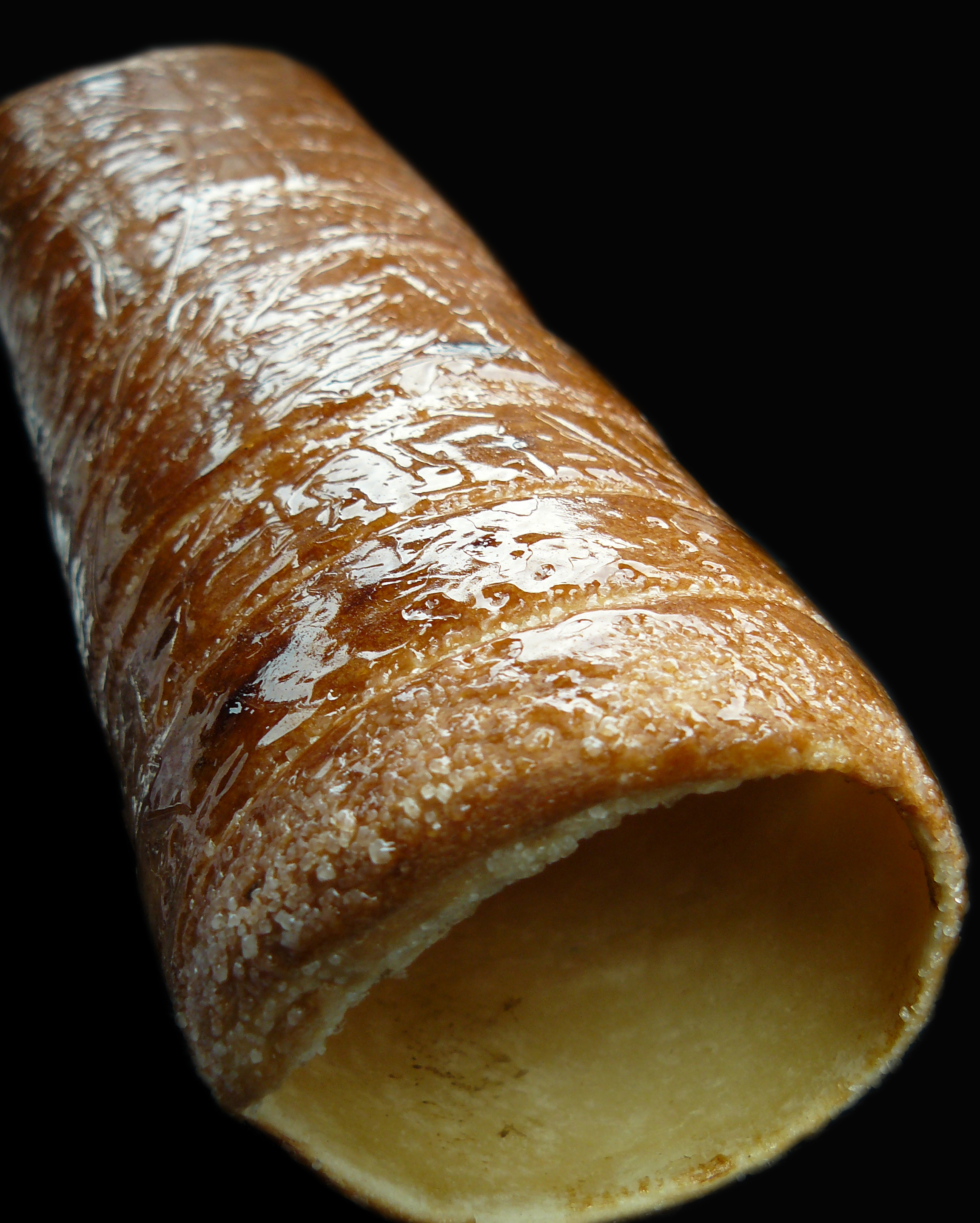
- Kürtőskalács with sugar
- Region or state: Székely Land
- Main ingredients: Flour, sugar, milk, butter, eggs, yeast, salt

Kürtőskalács (Hungarian: [ˈkyrtøːʃkɒlaːt͡ʃ]; Romanian: colac/cozonac secuiesc; German: Baumstriezel; English: chimney cake) is a spit cake specific to Hungarians from Transylvania, more specifically the Székelys. Originally popular in the Székely Land, it became popular in both Hungary and Romania. The first written record dates back to 1679 and was found in the village of Úzdiszentpéter (now Sânpetru de Câmpie), while the first recipe appears in a manuscript cookbook dated in 1781. Earlier a festive treat, now it is part of everyday consumption. A similar pastry to kürtőskalács is Baumstriezel, originating in the Transylvanian Saxon communities.

Kürtőskalács is made from sweet, yeast dough (raised dough), of which a strip is spun and then wrapped around a truncated cone-shaped baking spit, and rolled in granulated sugar. It is roasted over charcoal while basted with melted butter, until its surface cooks to a golden-brown color. During the baking process the sugar stuck on the kürtőskalács caramelises and forms a crisp, shiny crust. The surface of the cake can then be topped with additional ingredients such as ground walnut or powdered cinnamon.

== Etymology ==
The name refers to a stovepipe (kürtő), since the fresh, steaming cake in the shape of a truncated cone resembles a hot chimney.

This opinion is shared by Attila T. Szabó, scholar and philologist from Cluj-Napoca: "...when taken off from the spit in one piece, the cake assumes the shape of a 25–30-centimetre [10–12 in] long vent or tube. Since the cake is served in this tubular form to family and guests, and consumers are faced with this typical, vent-like image of the dough to be torn off in strips, it is self-evident that its name must have been given with regard to the vent shape of the cake".

Throughout the centuries, miscellaneous alternate names and spellings of "kürtőskalács" have been used. More references were mentioned even in the 19th century (e.g. dorongfánk 'spit-donut' or botratekercs 'stick roll' or botfánk 'stick-donut'). The name "kürtőskalács" originated in Transylvania and became popular only by the middle of the 20th century. Until the end of the century it had different spellings (e.g. spelt with 'ö' as in kürtöskalács ('horn cake') or in two words, as in kürtős kalács. The present variant "kürtőskalács" was first used in print in a cookbook, published in 1926 by the book department of 'Brassói Lapok', a newspaper from Brașov.

== History ==
The first known record that hints at a family of cakes baked by rotating spit over cinders dates back to medieval times (about 1450) and is found in a manuscript from Heidelberg. The description mentions a strip of raised dough that has to be wound in a helix shape around a baking spit, and brushed with egg yolk before baking.

Since the 16th century, the evolution of the cake family proceeded in three branches. The first branch contains pastries that preserved the image of cake similar to the one mentioned above, with a strip wound on spit in a helical shape. The Szekler-Hungarian kürtőskalács, Skalický trdelník (trdelník from Skalica), and the Czech-Moravian trdlo/trdelnice/trdelník, which is virtually the same as the latter, as well as the kürtősfánk (kürtősh donut) belong to this branch. The second branch has pastries made from batter, namely the Lithuanian raguolis and šakotis, Polish sękacz, the French gateau à la broche, the German Baumkuchen, the Austrian Prügeltorte and Prügelkrapfen as well as the Swedish Spettekaka. The third branch is represented by one cake, the Transylvanian Saxon Baumstriezel, where a continuous dough strip is placed on a spit.

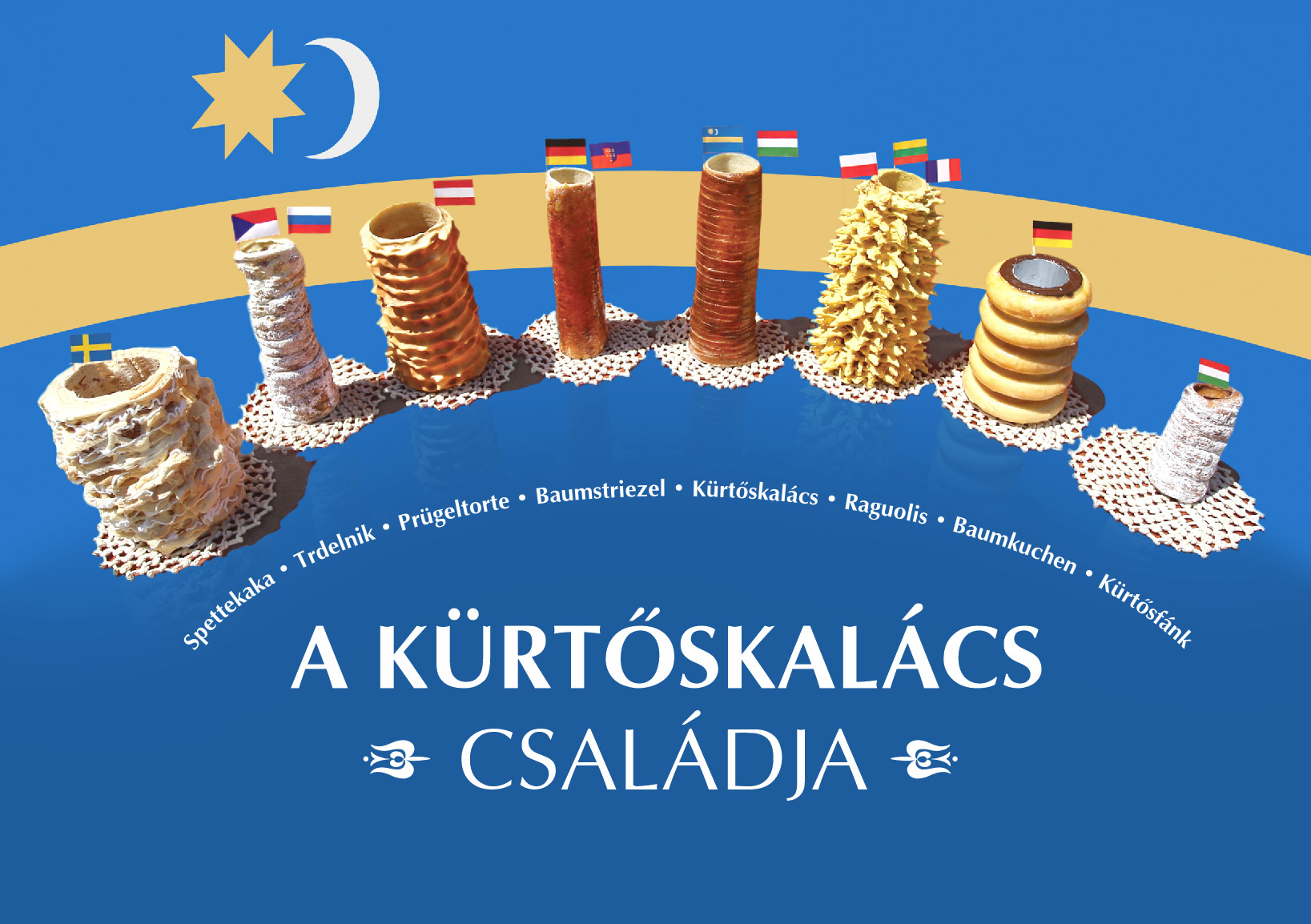
A variety of European spit cakes

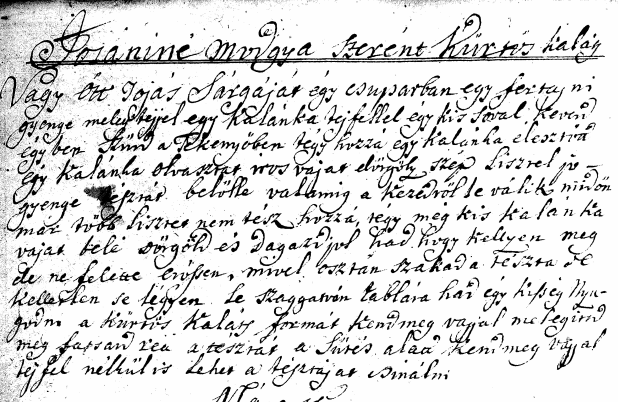
Excerpt from the cookbook of Count Mária Mikes of Zabola, with the first known recipe of kürtőskalács

The first known recipe of Kürtőskalács originates from Transylvania, included in the 1784 cookbook of Countess Mária Mikes of Zabola ("‘kürtős kaláts’ à la Mrs. Poráni"). It makes no mention, however, of sweetening of any kind in the preparation. A recipe from the cookbook written by Kristóf Simai in 1795 in Upper Hungary (present-day Slovakia) first mentioned "sweetening subsequent to baking". The Skalicky trdelnik, a variant from the 18th century is based on similar preparation, with the cake surface covered in chopped nuts (e.g. walnut, almond) before baking, and sugar that is added only subsequent to baking.

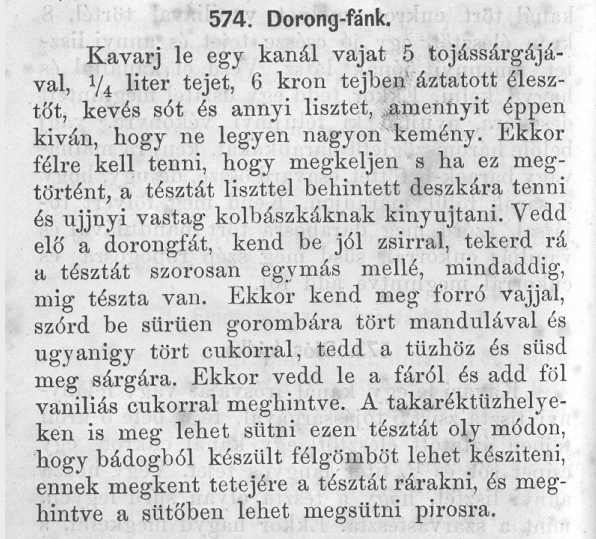
Excerpt from Rézi néni Szakácskönyve (Aunt Rézi's Cookbook), published in Szeged in 1876, with the first recipe that applies sprinkling sugar on kürtőskalács before baking to achieve a caramelized sugar glaze

Almost 100 years passed before the first mention was made of the next step in the evolution of kürtőskalács, the appearance of a caramelized sugar glaze, in Aunt Rézi's Cookbook written by Terézia Dolecskó in 1876, published in Szeged, Hungary. The recipe suggests "sprinkling sugar (sugar almond) on dough on spit a priory to baking". Due to the heat, the sugar is caramelized and also enters in what is known as Maillard reaction. The sugar glaze that melts to become caramel forms a continuous coat, also adds to firmness of cake. Shortly afterwards, pure sugar (not almond sugar) was applied to the dough's surface before baking, even with the omission of sweetening subsequent to baking. Ágnes Zilahi's cookbook entitled Valódi Magyar szakácskönyv (The Real Hungarian Cookbook), which appeared in Budapest in 1892, presents such a recipe.

The first mention of additional toppings applied to the caramel glaze appears in Rézi néni szakácskönyve (Aunt Rézi's Cookbook). The use of ground, chopped or candied walnuts applied as an additional topping became popular only in the late 20th century. As far as we know Pál Kövi's cookbook, Erdélyi lakoma (Transylvanian Feast), which came out in 1980, seems to be the first source with the tip of applying this type of topping. The wide spectrum of cinnamon, coconut, cocoa, etc. toppings started to receive wide application only at the end of the century.

The current, most frequently baked variant of kürtőskalács evolved in Szeklerland in the first half of the 20th century. It is specific to this variant that the surface of the raw dough wrapped around the spit flattens out by the usual procedure of rolling it on a flat surface sprinkled with granulated sugar. By this procedure the layers of dough wrapped around the spit are pressed together, rendering the cake smoother, more compact in structure and more elegant. The first written record of this technique appears in the cookbook of Mrs. Zathureczky, née Manci Zlech, which was published in Barót between 1934 and 1943. The cookbook, entitled Erdélyi ízek (Flavors of Transylvania), which appeared in Miercurea-Ciuc, published in 2007, gives a recipe of this sort.

=== Spread ===
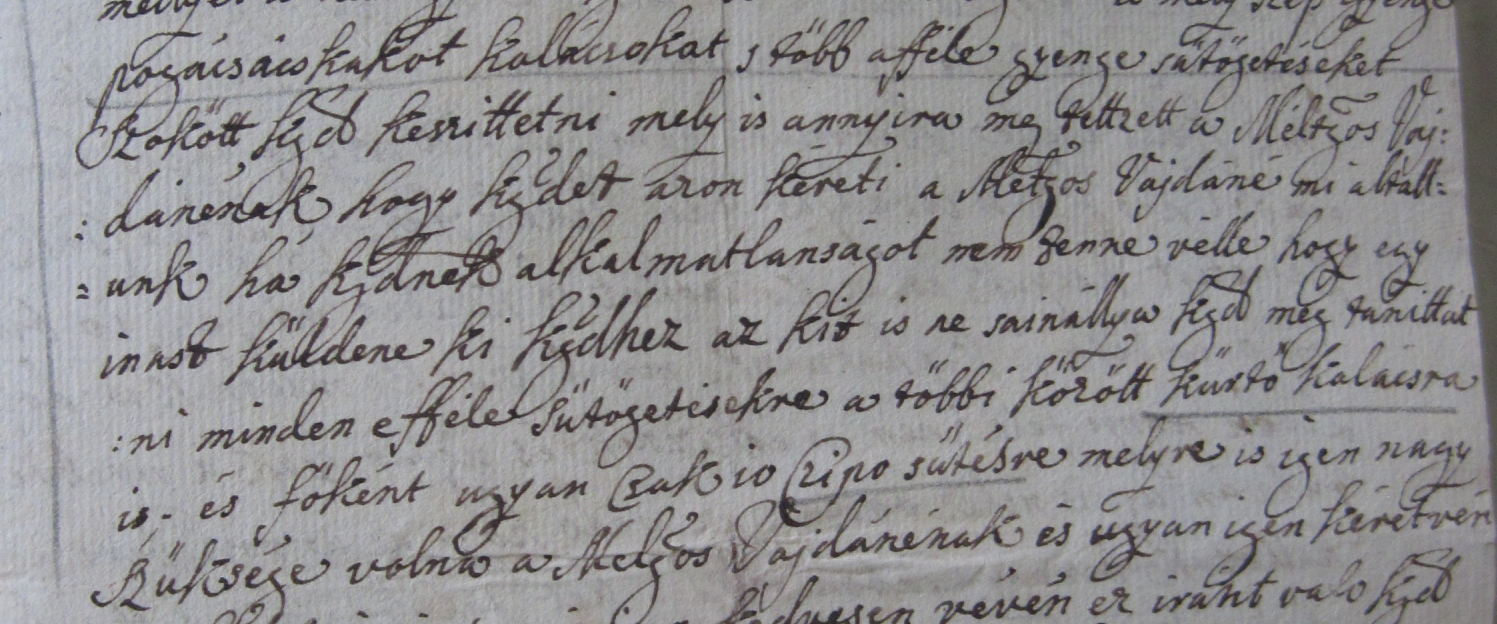
Excerpt from a letter of Mrs. Feratti, née Ágnes Kálnoki (Iași, 1723), in which is the first mention of the term kürtő kaláts, i.e. kürtőskalács. The original letter can be found in the Cluj State Archive.

Kürtőskalács became popular among the Hungarian nobility at the beginning of the 18th century. One hint at an Austrian or German origin is the fact that a conservative Transylvanian nobleman, Péter Apor, in his work Metamorphosis Transylvaniae does not mention Kürtőskalács in the list of traditional Hungarian foods, for all the evidence we have about the cake already existing in his wife's cuisine. In a letter from a mother superior in Moldavia addressed to Mrs Péter Apor, née Borbála Kálnoki, the writer asks Mrs. Apor to have a butler of hers taught the art of baking kürtőslalács: "Honored mother Superior prays you if she could send you a butler in the hope perchance you spare no pain and teach him kindly some art of baking kürtőslalács withal others". By the end of the 18th century, kürtőskalács had become popular in all Hungarian speaking regions as a defining element of both urban and rustic cuisine. In the first volume of A Székelyföld leírása (Description of the Szeklerland) from 1868, Balázs Orbán writes about the genesis legend of Udvarhelyszék, which holds that the Szeklers, chased into caves and later blockaded by the Tatars, eventually made the enemy leave by presenting them a huge kürtőskalács made of straw which they held out of the cave to show they had supplies to endure the siege. Throughout the 19th and 20th centuries, the recipe of the cake was recorded in numerous popular cookbooks.

As a result of urbanization at the beginning of the 20th century, kürtőskalács was replaced by newer cakes. But on the eastern periphery of the Hungarian speaking regions, in the Szeklerland, the open fireplace survived to the end of the 19th century, and consequently, kürtőskalács has been preserved as a living tradition on regions dwelt by Szeklers. Up to the present kürtőskalács baked above cinders is regarded as essential to the Transylvanian wedding menu.

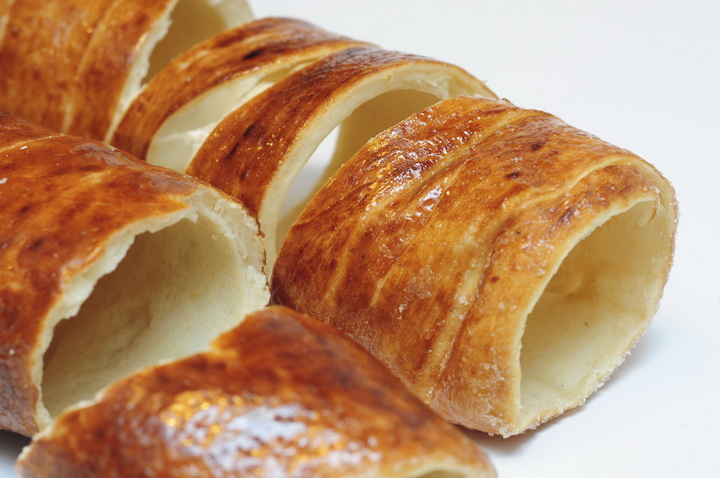
Ready to eat

Following the regime change of 1989, and the aftermath the kürtőskalács became the traditional local treat offered to tourists visiting Szekler villages and thus a representative element of the area, for a wider mass of people. This gastronomic tradition, which earlier had been preserved merely in rural Szekler communities, gradually found its way back to mainstream culture, mainly due to tourism. By the middle of the 1990s, kürtőskalács became popular in most cities in Hungary, and tourists visiting Hungary reported on "the gorgeous, sweet, tubular treat" with admiration. Due to its initial increase and later surge in popularity, initially in the Hungarian speaking community and later in the wide Transylvanian community mainly through tourism, the kürtőskalács is no longer regarded as a solely Szekler or Hungarian symbol, but rather as representative element in European gastronomy, as part of the greater family of chimney cakes, manufacturers of this sweet treat being present Europe-wide.

Measures to have kürtőskalács registered in the European Union as a product of Protected designation of origin (PDO) have been taken, although as of 2024 no such designation has been attributed or recorded as pending in any EU-wide database of registered and/or protected status for foodstuffs.

== Variants ==
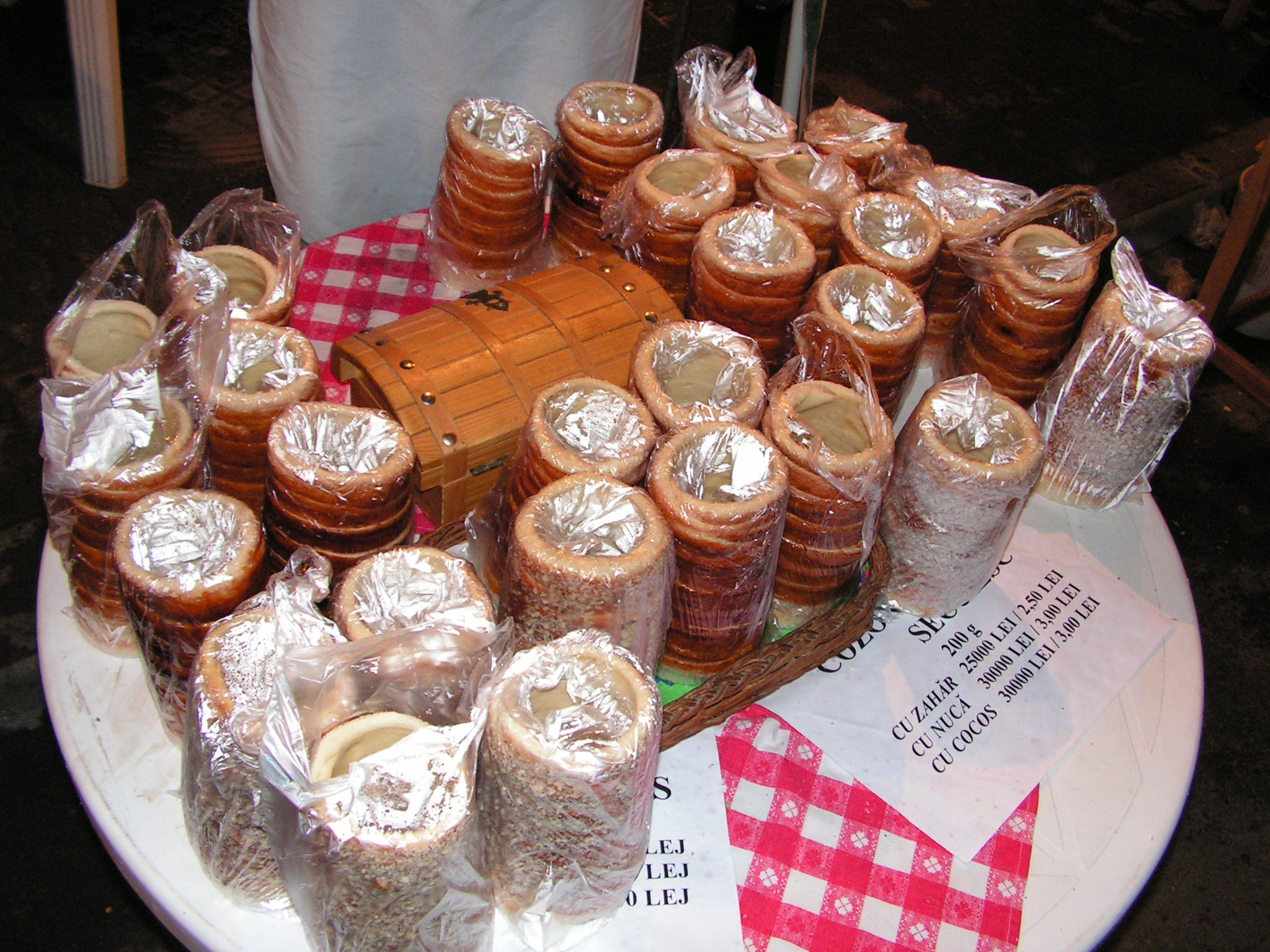
Varieties of Kürtőskalács

Three variants of kürtőskalács can be distinguished, which are nonetheless manufactured in a similar way.

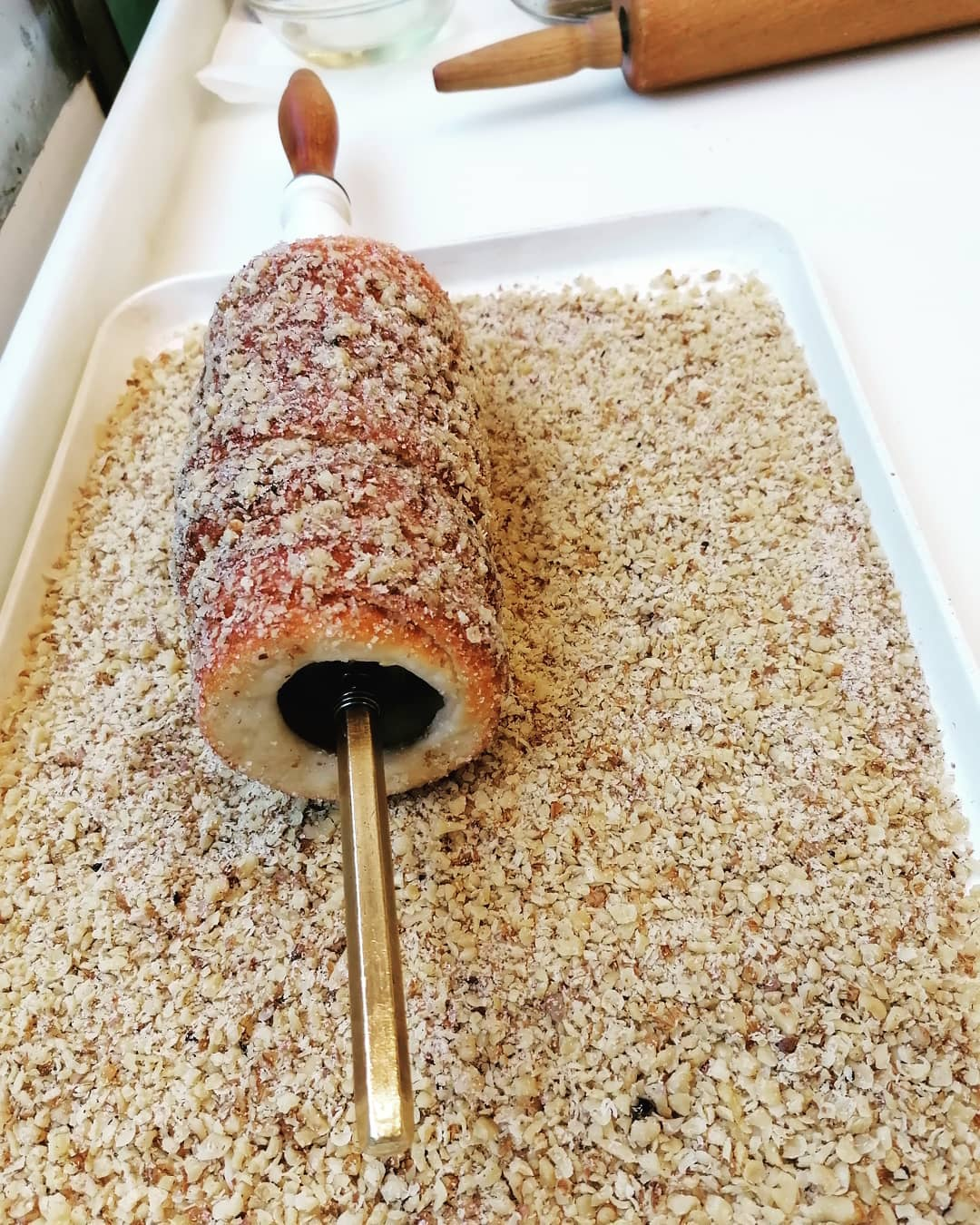
Chimney Cake - Kürtőskalács with Walnut

The recipe of the traditional, homemade variant became standardized at the beginning of the 20th century. The ingredients are firmly specified and it is usually baked above cinders. The essential ingredients are exclusively: sugar, wheat flour, butter, milk, eggs, yeast and salt. Additional toppings are restricted to ground or chopped walnut, almond, cinnamon powder or vanilla sugar made from natural vanilla powder.

Variants at carnivals became popular in the late 20th century. With this variant, the recipe is more flexible so that it can be manufactured in smaller, mobile places, rendering it much cheaper. In this variant, butter can be replaced by vegetable oil or margarine, and milk by milk powder. Moreover, eggs can be replaced by egg powder or liquid eggs, but this ingredient can also be omitted. In exchange, grated lemon zest, natural citrus extract or citrus juice, rum or vanilla sugar powder can be added to the dough. The surface can be provided any additional topping that bears flavor and aroma.

Further alternative variants appeared at the beginning of the 21st century. These recipes can be even more flexible. The dough can be made of non–wheat flour. The inner, tubular part can be also given an additional coating, and it can abound in other natural ingredients (e.g. pieces of fruit). Alternative kürtőskalács can be prepared gluten free as well. A cake that lacks ingredients of animal origin (milk, butter, eggs) can be labeled as 'Vegan' or 'Lent'.

Kürtősfánk (Kürtősh Donut) is a similar-shaped cake, which is baked in oil or fat and topped with sugar after baking or stuffed with whipped cream.

== Baking process ==
Kürtőskalács is made of a relatively hard and dry yeast-dough. A "twine" of dough is wrapped around the length of the spit, and then the spit with the strip of dough on it is rolled in sugar. Before or during baking, it's brushed with melted butter. The cake is ready when its surface has an even, brownish–red color. Strictly, homemade kürtőskalács can be made exclusively from natural ingredients (flour, sugar, milk, butter, eggs, yeast and salt). For other variants, of all ingredients it is merely margarine and vanilla sugar powder that can be synthetic, including ingredients of the final topping.

Kürtőskalács can be enriched by further aromas and flavors if the completed cake is provided a final topping. Any topping can be used that does not contain salt, cheese, meat or other non-confectionery ingredients.

Among pastries that are most closely related to kürtőskalács, the Transylvanian Saxon Baumstriezel has a cylinder shape, rather than a helix. Skalický trdelník from Slovakia (formerly Upper Hungary), as well as trdlo/trdelnice/trdelník from the Czech–Moravian region, differ from kürtőskalács in that there is no caramel sugar glaze applied to their surface.

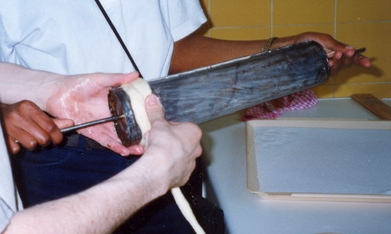
Winding the dough-strip on the spit

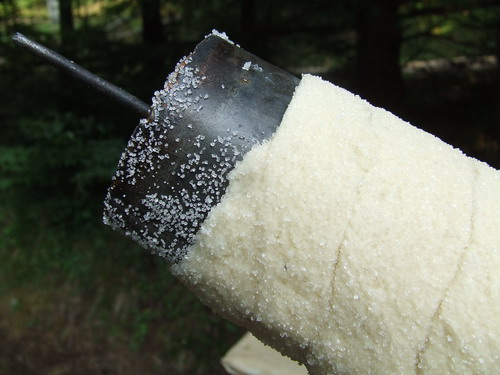
After rolling in sugar

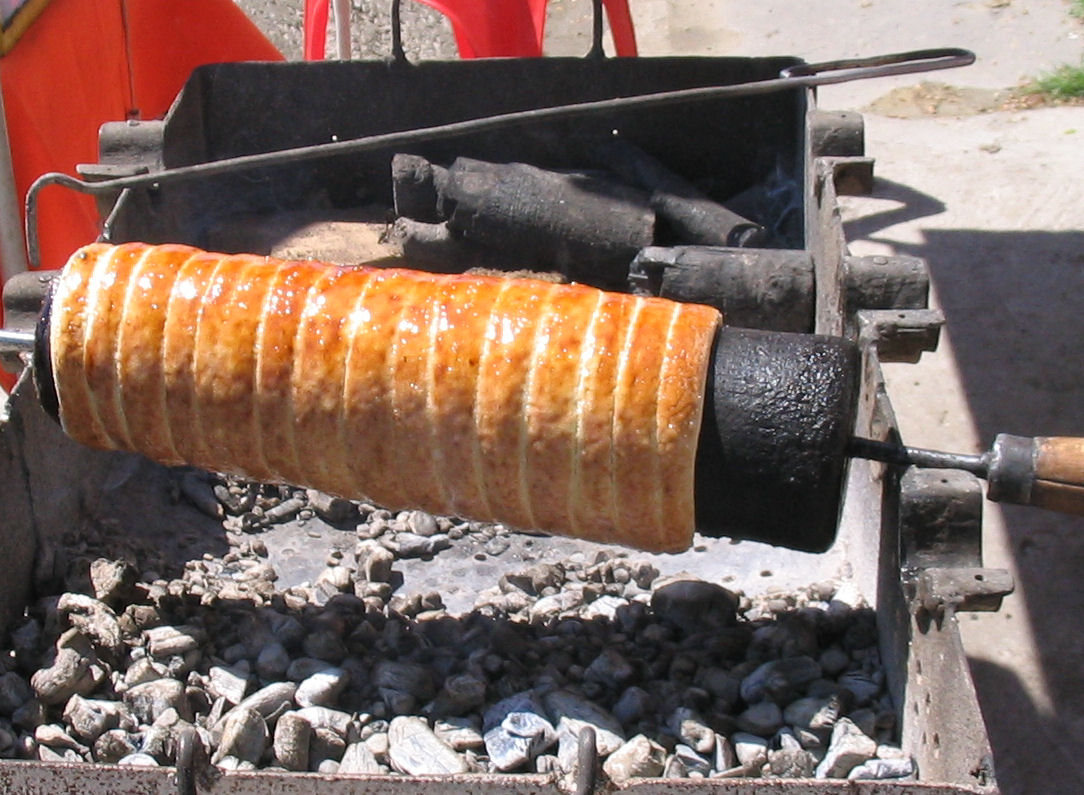
The baking is finished.

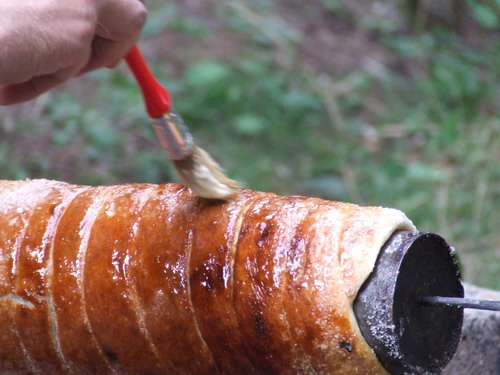
Brushing with melted butter while baking

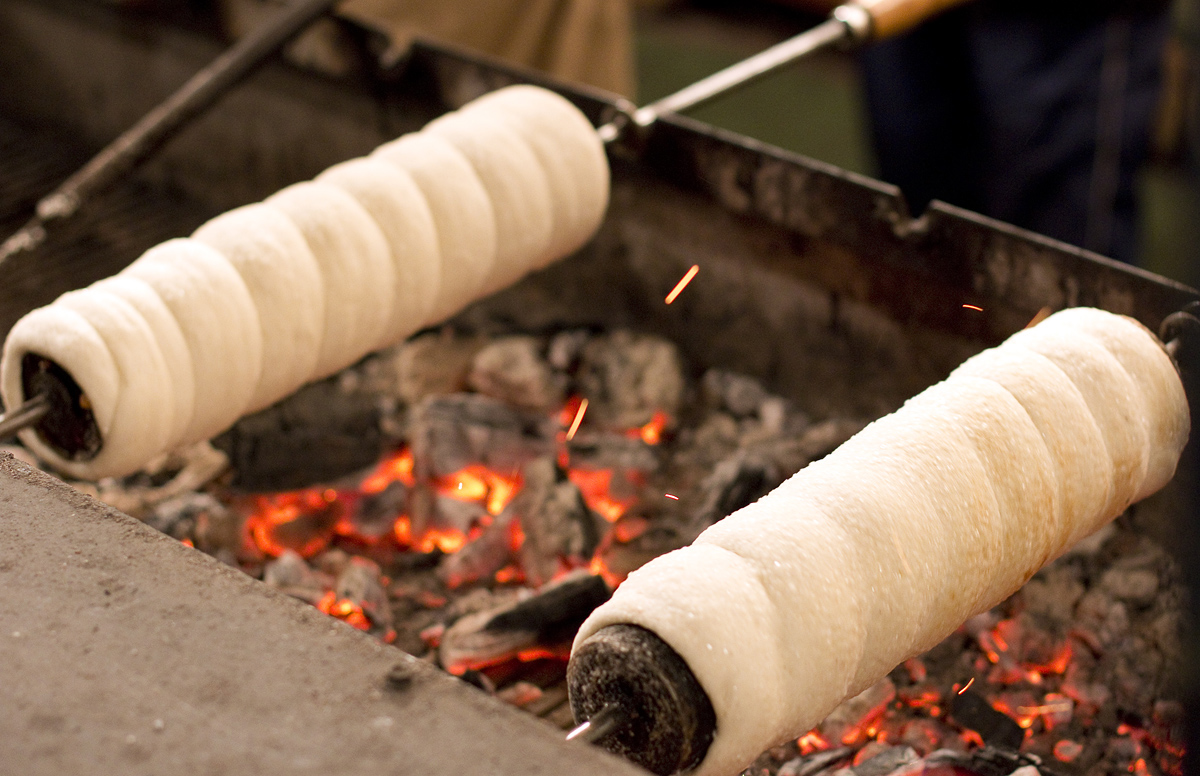
Christmas market in Budapest

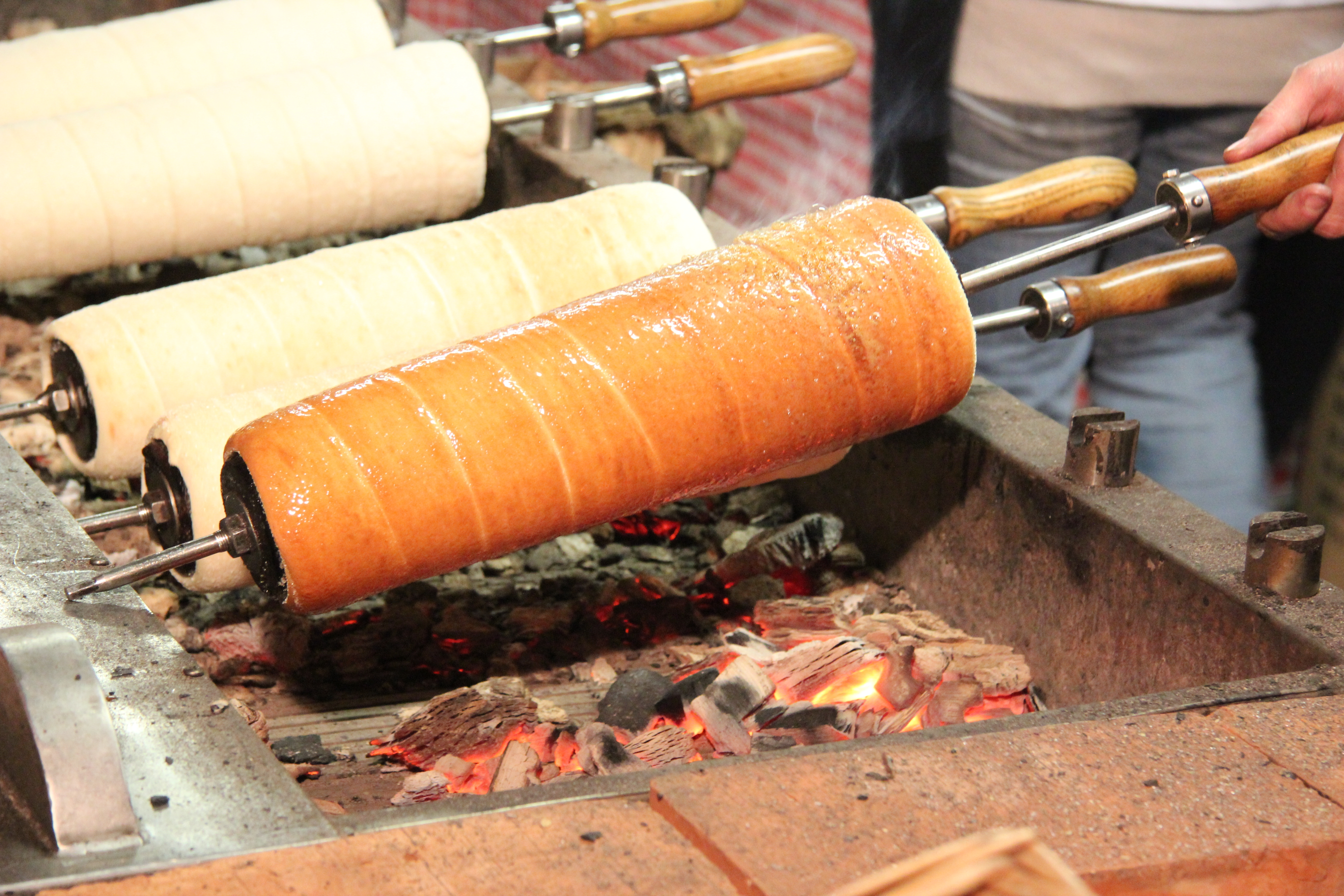
Christmas market in Budapest

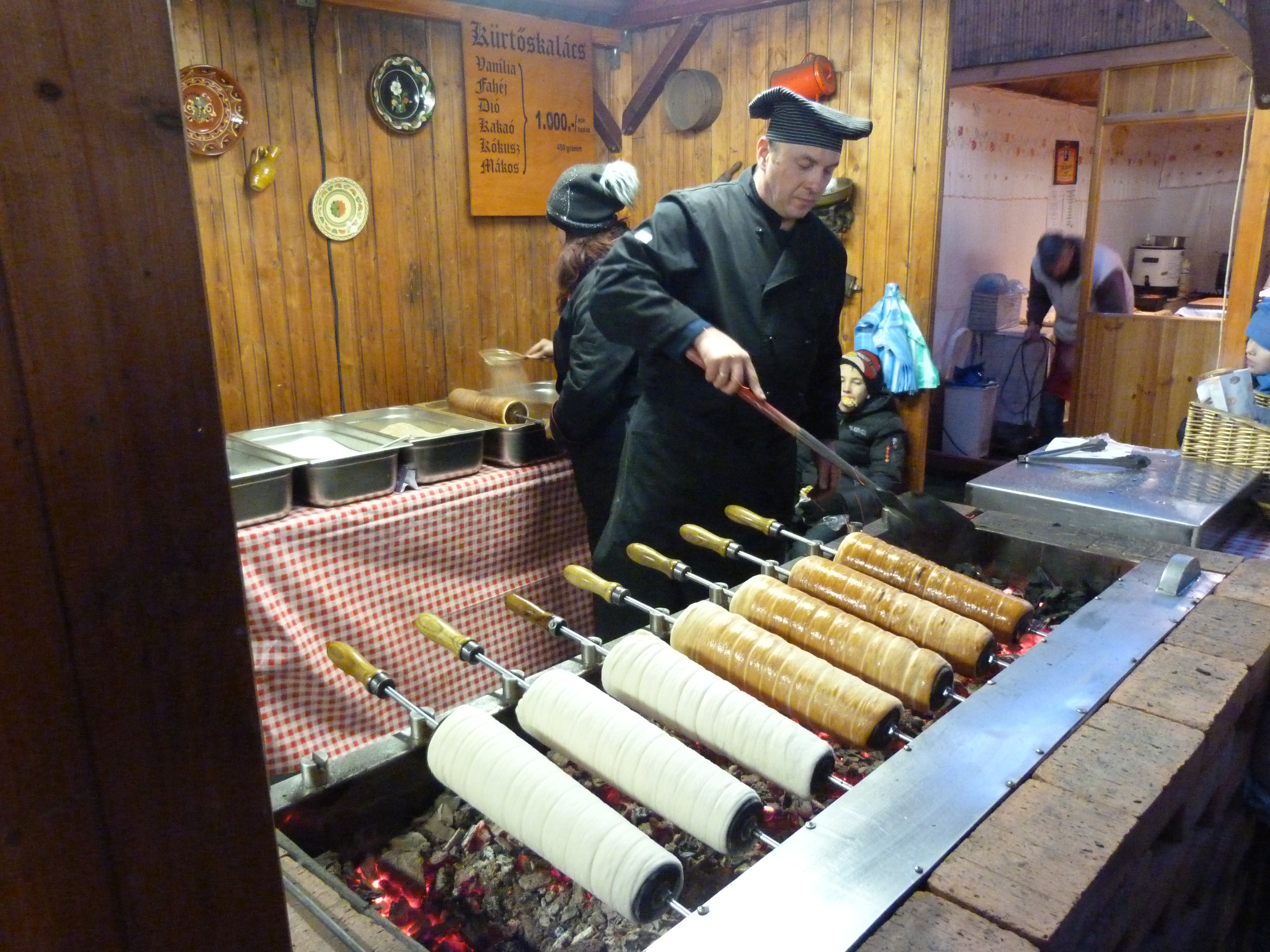
Festival in Miskolc

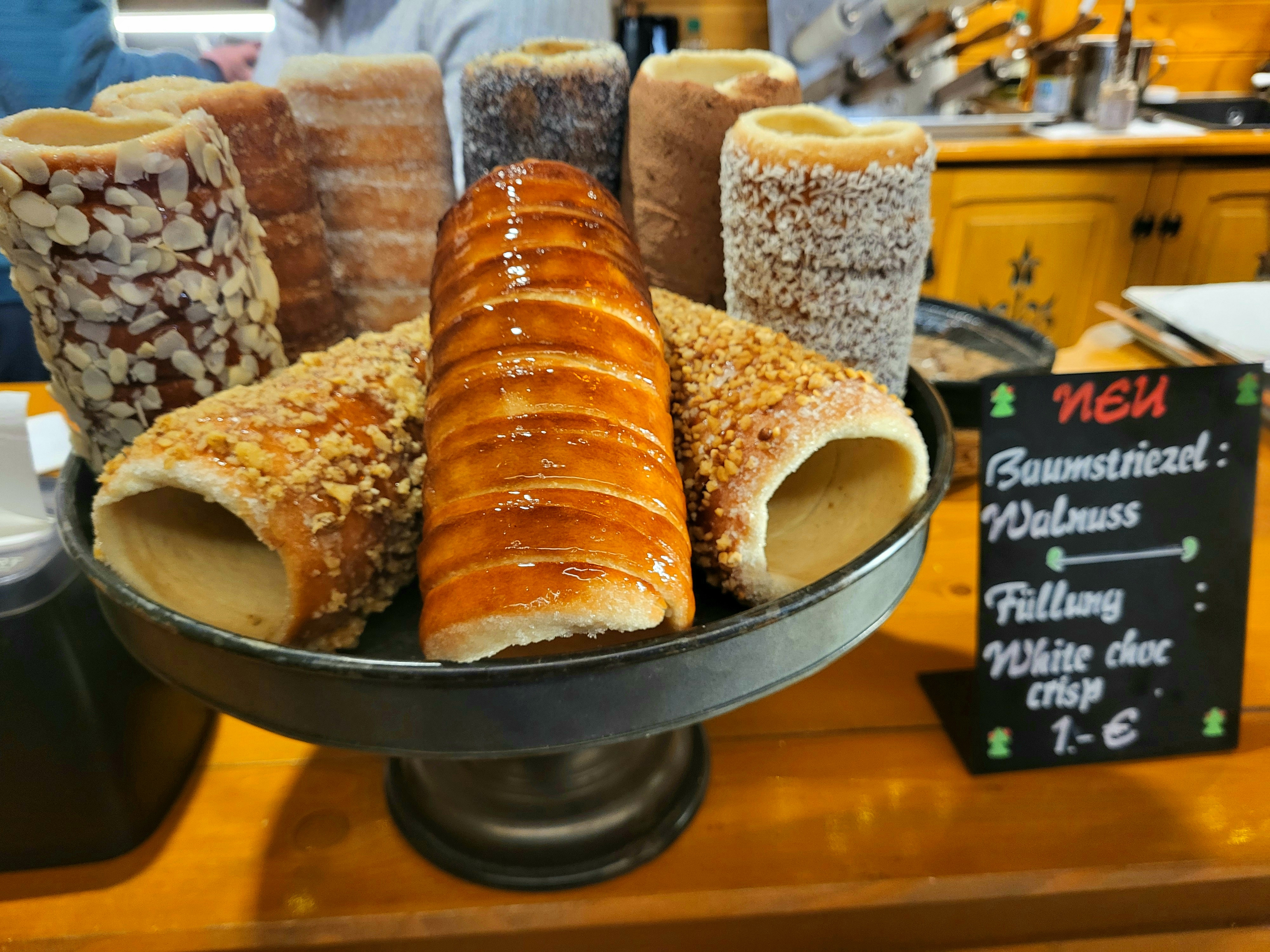
Baumstriezel from a christmas market in Passau, Bavaria

== Foreign names ==
Neighboring nations have their own names for the cake. Amongst Saxons, who earlier dwelt in Transylvania, the literal translation of the word kürtőskalács, or Schornsteinkuchen, became popular. Poles use the phonetic transcription of the word kürtőskalács and the translation of the adjective – noun cluster of magyar kalács or székely kalács (Kurtoszkalacz or węgierski kołacz and Romanians respectively use Cozonac Secuiesc, indicating it as a sweet treat similar to the much familiar Cozonac and its origin in the Szekler community of Transylvania). Other versions use either a phonetic transcription of the entire compound word (Kurtosh Kalach), or a phonetic transcription of the cluster's first element, such as "Kurtosh" for kürtős followed by a translation of its second element, such as "cake" for kalács. The German name for the pastry is Baumstriezel.

== See also ==
- Hungarian cuisine
- Romanian cuisine
- Transylvanian Saxon cuisine
- List of pastries
- List of spit-roasted foods
